= Family tree of Bruneian monarchs =

The following is a family tree of Malay monarchs of Brunei.

House of Bolkiah

Muhammad; Shah^{(1)} r. 1363–1402	Ahmad^{(3)} r. 1408–1425
Abdul Majid; Hassan^{(2)} r. 1402–1408	♀ Putri Ratna; Kusuma	Sharif Ali^{(4)} r. 1425–1432
Sulaiman^{(5)} r. 1432–1485
Bolkiah^{(6)} r. 1485–1524
Abdul Kahar^{(7)} r. 1524–1530	Pengiran; Muhammad; Tajuddin
Saiful Rijal^{(8)} r. 1533–1581
Shah Brunei^{(9)} r. 1581–1582	Muhammad; Hasan^{(10)} r. 1582–1598
Abdul; Jalilul Akbar^{(11)} r. 1598–1659	Ibrahim Ali; Omar Shah; Sultan of Sarawak r. 1598–1641	Muhammad; Ali^{(13)} r. 1660–1661	Muwallil; Wasit I Sultan of Sulu r. 1610–1650	♀ Pengiran; Tuah	Pengiran; Muhammad; Panjang; Bendahara; Sri Maharaja
Pengiran; Abdullah; Pengiran; Muda Besar	Abdul Jalilul; Jabbar^{(12)} r. 1659–1660	Muhyiddin^{(15)} r. 1673–1690	House of Sambas	Husin; Kamaluddin^{(17)} r. 1710–1730, 1737–1740	House of Sulu	♀ Pengiran; Siti Nur; Alam	Abdul; Hakkul Mubin^{(14)} r. 1661–1673
Nasruddin^{(16)} r. 1690–1710	Pengiran; Shah Mubin	Pengiran; Anak Abdul
Muhammad; Alauddin^{(18)} r. 1730–1737
Omar Ali; Saifuddin I^{(19)} r. 1740–1795	♀ Pengiran; Anak Nur; Alam	Pengiran; Anak Kasim	♀ Pengiran; Anak Bungsu
Pengiran; Anak Abdul; Wahab	Muhammad; Tajuddin^{(20)} r. 1795–1804, 1804–1807	♀ Pengiran; Anak Bulan	Muhammad; Kanzul Alam^{(22)} r. 1807–1826	♀ Pengiran; Anak Saleha
Muhammad; Jamalul; Alam I^{(21)} r. 1804–1804	♀ Pengiran; Puteri Anak; Nur Alam; Murtan Nisa	Muhammad; Alam^{(23)} r. 1826–1828	Pangeran; Anak; Muhammad; Tajuddin	♀ Pengiran; Anak Siti; Khadijah	♀ Pengiran; Anak Puteri; Siti Mariam	Pangeran; Sulaiman
Omar Ali; Saifuddin II^{(24)} r. 1828–1852	Pengiran; Anak; Muhammad; Tajuddin	♀ Pengiran; Fatimah
♀ Pengiran; Anak; Fatimah	Abdul Momin^{(25)} r. 1852–1885	♀ Pengiran; Anak Puteri; Zubaidah	Pengiran; Anak; Muhammad; Salleh	Hashim; Jalilul Alam; Aqamaddin^{(26)} r. 1885–1906	♀ Pengiran; Anak Saleha	Pengiran; Muhammad; Jamalul Alam
Pengiran; Omar Ali	♀ Pengiran; Anak Siti; Zubaidah	Pengiran; Anak; Muhammad	Pengiran; Omar Ali; Saifuddin; Pengiran; Muda Besar	♀ Pengiran; Anak Siti; Khadijah
♀ Pengiran; Anak Siti; Fatimah	Muhammad; Jamalul; Alam II^{(27)} r. 1906–1924	♀ Pengiran; Anak Damit	Pengiran; Anak; Tajuddin; Gador	Pengiran; Anak; Abdul; Rahman
Ahmad; Tajuddin^{(28)} r. 1924–1950	Omar Ali; Saifuddin III^{(29)} r. 1950–1967	♀ Pengiran; Anak Damit	♀ Pengiran; Anak Piut	Pengiran; Anak Haji; Metassan
♀ Pengiran; Anak Hajah; Besar	Pengiran; Anak Haji; Muhammad; Alam
Hassanal; Bolkiah^{(30)} r. 1967–present	♀ Pengiran; Anak Hajah; Saleha
Pengiran; Al-Muhtadee; Billah; Pengiran; Muda; Mahkota
