= Sultan of Brunei =

Sultan of Brunei Darussalam
- Sultan dan Yang Di-Pertuan Negara Brunei Darussalam
- Arms of His Majesty the Sultan of Brunei Darussalam

Incumbent
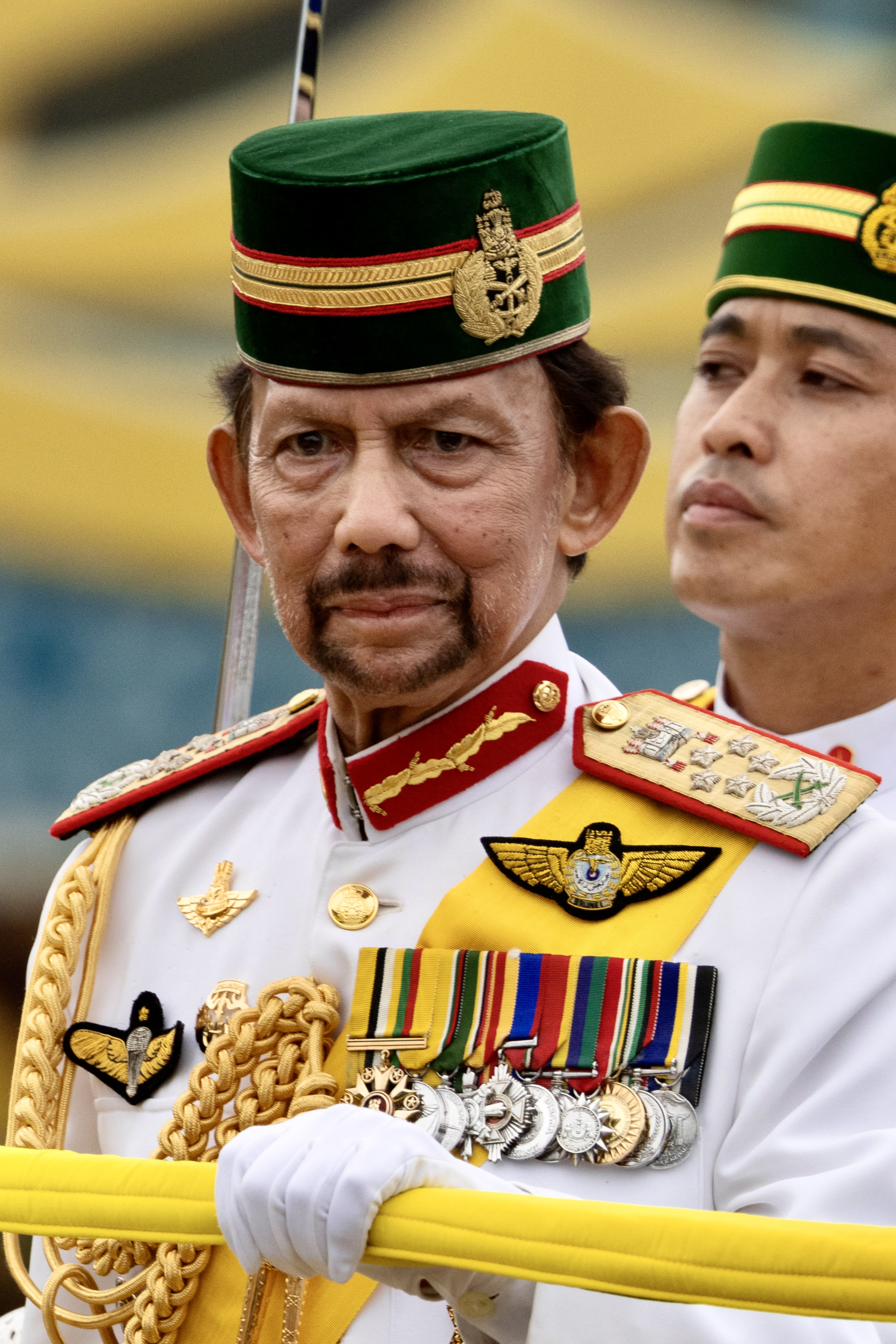
- Hassanal Bolkiah since 5 October 1967

Details
- Style: His Majesty
- Heir apparent: The Crown Prince Al-Muhtadee Billah
- First monarch: Sultan Muhammad Shah
- Formed: 1368; 658 years ago
- Residences: Istana Nurul Iman, Bandar Seri Begawan

The Sultan of Brunei (Malay: Sultan Brunei, Jawi: سلطان بروني) is the monarchical head of state of Brunei and head of government in his capacity as prime minister of Brunei. Since independence from the British in 1984, only one sultan has reigned, though the royal institution dates back to the 14th century. The sultan of Brunei can be thought of as synonymous with the ruling House of Bolkiah, with generations being traced from the first sultan, Muhammad Shah, temporarily interrupted by the thirteenth sultan, Abdul Hakkul Mubin, who in turn was deposed by a member of the House of Bolkiah. The sultan's full title is His Majesty The Sultan and Yang di-Pertuan Negara of Brunei Darussalam. The Sultan of Brunei was also regarded as the Sultan of Sarawak, Labuan and Sabah before the Europeans took over the three territories.

The sultan of Brunei is one of the world's richest people and monarchs.

== Sultans ==
Sultans of Brunei since 1368
No.	Portrait	Name	Reign start	Reign end	Notes
1		Muhammad Shah / Awang Alak Betatar	1363/1368	1402	He founded modern Brunei in the early 1360s after converting to Islam. He established a new administrative centre near the Brunei River, enhancing his control over the region. Under his rule, Brunei expanded its territories by seizing land from the declining Majapahit Empire and subduing local vassals. His conversion to Islam, motivated by a marriage alliance with the Sultan of Johor, marked a significant shift from a Hindu-Buddhist monarchy to an Islamic sultanate. He also engaged in diplomatic relations with Ming China.
2		Abdul Majid Hassan / Maharaja Karna	1402	1408	In 1405, he sent envoys to China to pay homage to the Yongle Emperor, receiving an imperial mandate and seal in return. His visit to Nanjing in 1408 marked him as the first foreign king to attend the imperial court under the emperor. After spending over a month at the court, he fell ill and died on 19 October 1408, at the age of 28. His final wishes included being buried in China, and he was interred at the Tomb of the King of Boni in Nanjing, where his grave was later rediscovered and designated a historical site.
3		Ahmad / Awang Pateh Berbai	1408	1425	During his reign, he established diplomatic ties with Ming China, undertaking a tribute mission to the court of Yongle Emperor, where he personally pledged loyalty and presented gifts. This mission positioned him as the first southern ruler to formally engage in such tributes, enhancing Brunei's standing with the Ming dynasty.
4		Sharif Ali / Sultan Barkat (Blessed Sultan)	1425	1432	Previously the Sharif of Mecca of the Mamluk Sultanate and has no direct genealogical relation to the predecessor, but was selected as he was the son-in-law of his predecessor and was well versed in Islam.
5		Sulaiman	1432	1485	He promoted the spread of Islam while overseeing the construction of Kota Batu. His reign was notable for the fair application of the Brunel Legal Code, as evidenced by his stern punishment of royal relatives who violated Islamic teachings, reflecting his commitment to justice. He abdicated in 1485 in favour of his son Bolkiah, taking on the title Paduka Seri Begawan Sultan.
6		Bolkiah / Nakhoda Ragam (The Singing Captain)	1485	1524	His reign marked Brunei's golden age, during which he significantly expanded the empire's territory to include present-day Sarawak, Sabah, Manila, and the Sulu Archipelago. His military successes against rival states like the Sultanate of Sulu and Saludang enhanced Brunei's influence and wealth, facilitating the spread of Islam in the region. His interactions with European explorers, particularly in 1521 during the Magellan expedition, highlighted Brunei's diplomatic strength and cultural richness.
7		Abdul Kahar	1524	1530	He established trade relations with the Portuguese, including a friendship and trade agreement with his predecessor after Portuguese explorer Jorge de Menezes visited Brunei in 1526. During his reign, he undertook naval expeditions to expand Brunei's territories, reaching regions such as Palawan, Sulu, and Luzon, and introduced a new currency called pitis. He abdicated in 1530.
8		Saiful Rijal	1530	1581	His reign was marked by the Castilian War, which began after the Spanish accused Brunei of supporting Muslim missionary activities in the Philippines. In retaliation for Brunei's disregard of their orders, the Spaniards attacked and briefly captured the capital in 1578. He relocated the capital to Saragua and strengthened the Brunei military. After the Spaniards retreated later that year, he oversaw the reconstruction of the capital.
9		Shah Brunei	1581	1582	Eldest son of Sultan Saiful Rijal
10		Muhammad Hasan	1582	1598	He enhanced infrastructure with the construction of palaces and bridges to improve governance. He appointed new Wazirs, defended Sunni Islam in the Philippines, and led military campaigns against the Milau clan in Sarawak. His reign fostered strong ties with the Sultanate of Pahang, and he influenced legal codes through his establishment of comprehensive canons addressing daily life.
11		Abdul Jalilul Akbar	1598	1659	During his rule, he strengthened ties with the Spanish Empire, establishing a peace treaty and facilitating trade between Brunei and the Philippines. His reign also saw visits from notable traders, including Dutch trader Oliver Van Noort in 1600 and English businessman Sir Hendry Middleton in 1612. Notably, it was during this time that the Dutch began to establish trading centres in Borneo.
12		Abdul Jalilul Jabbar	1659	1660	He overthrew his elder brother, Raja Besar Pengiran Abdul, who had briefly claimed the title but was not recognised in the Sisilah. Muwallil Wasit I of Sulu intervened in the conflict by ordering the assassination of Raja Besar to support his nephew, Abdul Jalilul Jabbar. During his short reign, he maintained his father's Syariah Penal Code, known as Sultan Hasan's Canons.
13		Muhammad Ali	1660	1661	He implemented the Brunei Legal Code during a tumultuous period. His son, Pengiran Muda Bongsu, killed Pengiran Muhammad Alam, leading to a death sentence for Bongsu. When Abdul Hakkul Mubin requested to execute him, he refused. In retaliation, Mubin assassinated him during prayer on 16 November 1661, igniting the Bruneian civil war.
14		Abdul Hakkul Mubin	1661	1673	Declaring himself Sultan, he faced simmering opposition, which culminated in the Bruneian civil war led by Muhammad Ali's nephew, Pengiran Bendahara Muhyiddin. He retreated to Kinarut, where he resisted attacks until Muhyiddin sought aid from the Sultan of Sulu, offering territory in Sabah. Their forces besieged him at Pulau Chermin, leading to his defeat and execution, ending the civil war.
15		Muhyiddin	1673	1690	Following the Bruneian civil war, he ruled from Kampong Ayer, aiming to restore Muhammad Ali's family line but faced setbacks, eventually naming Pengiran Anak Muhammad Alam as Raja Bendahara. His reign lasted until 1690, marked by efforts to stabilise Brunei after the civil war and strengthen external relations, notably through correspondence with Jambi.
16		Nasruddin	1690	1710	During his 20-year reign, he maintained the trade relations with Manila established under Sultan Bolkiah. He also strengthened ties with the Pagaruyung Kingdom, appointing Dato Godam, a respected noble from Pagaruyung, as one of his trusted advisors. Dato Godam's descendants have since integrated into Brunei and Sarawak, and the bond between Brunei and Pagaruyung remains celebrated into the present day.
17		Husin Kamaluddin	1710	1730	During his reign, he continued the usage of Brunei pitis currency and introduced gold pitis coins featuring a cat and his title, Sultan Kamaluddin Malik Al Dzahir. In 1730, he appointed his son, Pengiran Anak Untong, as Raja of Dumpil Meruntum in Sabah, before abdicating the throne.
18		Muhammad Alauddin	1730	1737	Instructed Datu Imam Yaakub to write the Salsilah Raja-Raja Berunai or the Genealogy of the Sultans of Brunei.
(17)		Husin Kamaluddin	1737	1740	His decision to assume the throne once more stemmed from his belief that the lineage of Sultan Muhyiddin, who had supported Brunei during the civil war, deserved continuity in the crown. His reign emphasised loyalty to this line, leading him to eventually pass on the throne to a successor of Muhyiddin's lineage.
19		Omar Ali Saifuddin I	1740	1778	In 1769, he sent forces to reclaim Manila, previously part of Brunei's territory, and achieved success. Another challenge came from North Borneo, which had been promised to the Sultan of Sulu after the Bruneian civil war. In 1771, Sulu forces attacked Brunei, prompting him to seek British support; in return, the British secured exclusive pepper trade rights and established a temporary base in Labuan. However, due to financial strain, the British departed in 1777. He abdicated in 1778 in favour of his son, Pengiran Muda Besar Muhammad Tajuddin.
20		Muhammad Tajuddin	1778	1804	Ordered Khatib Abdul Latif to inscribe Batu Tarsilah or Stone Tablet.
21		Muhammad Jamalul Alam I	1804	1804	
(20)		Muhammad Tajuddin	1804	1807	
22		Muhammad Kanzul Alam	1807	1826	Pengiran Muda Muhammad Kanzul Alam, the son of Omar Ali Saifuddin I and Raja Puteri, rose to prominence as a regent and later Sultan of Brunei. Initially serving as regent for his nephew, Omar Ali Saifuddin II, he assumed the throne in 1826, but his reign faced significant challenges, including internal power struggles and growing discontent among local leaders.
23		Muhammad Alam	1826	1828	He was a self-proclaimed Sultan of Brunei. Under his reign, Brunei held onto its territory, which extended from Tanjong Datu in Sarawak to Kimanis in Sabah, despite being seen as a weak and increasingly protective country. Because of this, this article will also shed some light on the actual situation of the Bruneian Empire before its terrible fall soon after the battle. The majority of Bruneians despised him when he became Sultan, and he disregarded royal Bruneian customs, which sparked a second civil war between him and Pengiran Muda Omar Ali Saifuddin, his successor.
24		Omar Ali Saifuddin II	1828	1852	He appointed his uncle, Pengiran Muda Hashim, as Pengiran Bendahara, who sought British support from James Brooke to quell uprisings in Sarawak. This led to Brooke's appointment as Governor of Sarawak, and eventually, the Sultan ceded Kuching to Brooke in 1842. Over time, Brooke expanded Sarawak's territory, weakening Brunei. In 1846, after a British naval assault on Brunei Town, the Sultan pledged loyalty to Britain and signed the Treaty of Labuan and granted Britain significant control over Brunei's trade. Facing intense foreign pressure, he withdrew from active rule towards the end of his life, leaving governance to his son-in-law until his death in 1852.
25		Abdul Momin	1852	1885	His reign saw relentless pressure from foreign figures like James Brooke, the White Rajah, and American consul Charles Lee Moses, leading to the cession of large territories, including parts of present-day Sarawak. Manipulations by Brooke, particularly over land disputes, further weakened Brunei's sovereignty, resulting in an economic downturn as critical income sources were lost. Despite the 1885 Amanat, pledging the nobility to resist further territorial losses, Brunei's limited military strength made enforcement difficult. His reign ended with the cession of additional lands, such as Baram and Trusan, and he was succeeded by his brother-in-law, Pengiran Temenggong Pengiran Anak Hashim, upon his death in 1885.
26		Hashim Jalilul Alam Aqamaddin	1885	1906	Continued territorial losses despite the Amanat and the signing of the 1888 Protectorate Agreement with the British government. The arrival and Report On Brunei of Malcolm McArthur led to him signing the 1905–1906 Supplementary Agreement.
27		Muhammad Jamalul Alam II	1906	1924	He became the first Sultan of Brunei with the ability to speak English. Later, he introduced Islamic law, the Mohammedan Laws Enactment), to the sultanate in 1912. This was followed by the Marriage and Divorce Act in 1913. The arrival of Edward, Prince of Wales, to the sultanate on 18 May 1922. That same year, he became the first monarch to visit Singapore. Near the end of this reign saw the relocation of Istana Kampong Ayer to Istana Majlis. An outbreak of malaria claimed his life as well as three members of his family.
28		Ahmad Tajuddin	1924	1950	Oil was discovered early into his reign, in April 1929. He married Tengku Raihani on 30 April 1934. During his reign, he saw the Japanese occupation of Brunei from 1941 to 1945. He celebrated his Silver Jubilee on 22 September 1949. While at the Raffles Hotel, he became ill and died at the Singapore General Hospital on 3 June 1950.
29		Omar Ali Saifuddien III	1950	1967	Brunei saw substantial changes under his 17-year rule. He developed the Melayu Islam Beraja (MIB) philosophy, which serves as the nation's guiding ideology. He also initiated educational, religious, social and economic reform to ready his people for the restoration of the state's sovereign powers. He observed the drafting and the signing of the Constitution of Brunei in 1959. He also witnessed the strain that resulted from the Federation of Malaysia's merger, which set the stage for the 1962 Brunei revolt. In 1967, he abdicated in favour of his eldest son, Hassanal Bolkiah.
30		Hassanal Bolkiah	1967	Incumbent	Having reigned for 59 years after his father abdicated in 1967, he is the longest ruling sultan of Brunei and the longest reigning current monarch. Since Brunei gained its independence from the United Kingdom in 1984, he has also served as prime minister. He is among the world's few absolute monarchs. Some rankings list him as one of the richest people in the world. He commemorated his Golden Jubilee on 5 October 2017.

== Uncertainties ==
The earliest historical record of the Sultans of Brunei is not clearly known due to the poor early documentation of Brunei history. In addition there has been an effort to retroactively Islamise the history, with the "official history" not matching up with verifiable foreign sources. The Batu Tarsilah, the genealogical record of the kings of Brunei, was not started until 1807. Therefore, much of the interpretation of history relied on earlier Chinese sources and legends. It seems that the early Sultanate of Brunei was dependent on Chinese support, and perhaps early Sultans were of Chinese origin. Furthermore, the earliest Sultans may have been practicing the Hindu or Buddhist religions, with early names indicating this origin.

In recent years, Brunei's historiography has been reexamined due to the disparity between the official regnal years of the sultans and the historical facts that are currently available. An unnamed Tagalog trader who resided in Brunei before to 1590 made the first recorded attempt to document the country's history; scholar John S. Carroll subsequently published his work. By claiming that the Bruneians were invaders who subjugated the indigenous Bisayahs, this merchant distinguished clearly between accepted customs and empirical evidence. Although traditional belief credited this migration to Sultan Yuso, who supposedly came to Brunei after orchestrating a major exodus from the Malay-speaking city of Cauin, he suggested that the Bruneians moved from the Mekong Delta in the late 17th century. The trader said that Sultan Yuso conquered the Bisayahs, found riches, and was then granted power by the Chinese Emperor. Even while his story is full with regional folklore, it also makes reference to actual monarchs like Sultan Soliman and Sultan Abdul Kahar, which helps establish him as a reliable historian.

Datuk Imam Ya'akub, who wrote between 1680 and 1690, under Sultan Aliuddin's rule. He put together a Silsilah that served as the foundation for the initial sections of two books that Amin Sweeney revised. Regretfully, these passages contradict each other, casting doubt on Ya'akub's actual identification of Sultan Ahmad and whether he was referring to the Chinese mandarin Ong Sum Ping or Sultan Muhammad's brother. This suggests that the text has been corrupted over time. Prior to Donald Brown's publication of his work in 1970, Hugh Low's 1880 submission to the Journal of the Straits Branch of the Royal Asiatic Society was the first significant modern attempt to record Brunei's history. Despite having access to Pengiran Kasuma's Silsilah and other records, Low was unable to date Brunei's historical chronology since it lacked dates and allusions to outside events. Given the lengthy reigns of multiple sultans at that time, he surmised that the adoption of Islam and the founding of the dynasty most likely took place about 1403, but they may have happened earlier.

Due to differing opinions on the number of sultans mentioned in the Silsilah, it has been difficult to determine the exact date of Muhammad Shah. This disparity calls into doubt not only the notable lack of documents from 1690 to 1790, but also co-reigning sultans, competing monarchs, and lesser-known individuals, like the newborn Olivier van Noort cited. Sweeney's critical edition of the London manuscripts of the Silsilah was supposed to further historical study in Brunei, but in the end, it didn't because the inconsistencies in the texts made researchers hesitant to conduct more in-depth research. A significant contribution was made in 1970 by Donald Brown, who collected several historical views in his study Brunei: The Structure and History of a Bornean Malay Sultanate. He brought up Paul Pelliot's association between Mahmud Shah and Ma-ha-mo-sha, implying that Muhammad Shah's rule may have begun as early as the 14th century. But Brown also cited P. Manuel Teixeira's analysis of Rui de Brito Patalim's correspondence, which suggested that there were two different Bruneis: a pagan and a Muslim one. Local academics opposed this idea, arguing that Brunei was established as a Muslim kingdom under Muhammad Shah from the beginning.

An inscription discovered in 1979 indicated that Abdul Majid Hassan, the son of Muhammad Shah, died in 1048 AD (440 AH). This would have placed Brunei as the first Muslim kingdom in Southeast Asia and dated Muhammad's rule to the early 17th century. However, experts eventually refuted this notion. The release of an erroneous family tree that featured the fake Abdul Majid dashed hopes for a more academic study of Brunei's history, which had been raised by the establishment of the Brunei History Centre in 1984. A new history curriculum that mandated extensive textbooks in 1987 heightened the drive for clarity in Brunei's history and raised serious concerns about the reign of Muhammad Shah, Bendahara Sakam's accomplishments, and the circumstances surrounding Muhammad Aliuddin's death in 1690. In 1988, these important historical questions were still being debated.

== See also ==
- House of Bolkiah
- List of Bruneian royal consorts
- Succession to the Bruneian throne
