= Ong Sum Ping =

Bruneian nobility

Ong Sum Ping 黄森屏
- Pengiran Maharaja Lela
- Born: Ong Sum Ping; Fujian, China
- Died: Brunei Town, Brunei
- Spouse: Princess Ratna Dewi
Regnal name
- Pengiran Maharaja Lela Ong Sum Ping
- Occupation: Chief administrative officer

Ong Sum Ping
- Simplified Chinese: 黄森屏
- Traditional Chinese: 黃森屏
Transcriptions
Standard Mandarin
- Hanyu Pinyin: Huáng Sēnpíng
Southern Min
- Hokkien POJ: N̂g Serm-pîn

Ong Sum Ping (Chinese: 黄森屏; pinyin: Huáng Sēnpíng) is a legendary figure. Identified as Pengiran Maharaja Lela of Brunei. The Hokkien name implies that Ong Sum Ping was a native of Fujian, China.

== Career ==
During the Mongol conquest of China, Ong Sum Ping reportedly fled from Fujian with his siblings and traveled to East Kalimantan, according to The Philippine Islands, a book authored by H. Clark Company in 1903. According to Wen Xiongfei 温雄飞 in the 《南洋华侨史》, Ong Sum Ping came to Brunei in 1375 during the early years of China's Ming dynasty. The Brunei History Centre presents a rather incredible story in which Ong Sum Ping later married Princess Ratna Dewi, the daughter of Sultan Muhammad Shah of Brunei. For that he was conferred the nobility title of Pengiran Maharaja Lela and elected Chief of Kinabatangan. Some authors speculate that Ong Sum Ping could have been an admiral of Zheng He's navy who visited Brunei and stayed there due to the chieftain's connection to the Ming dynasty.

Local Brunei Malay folklore suggest that there was a Chinese settlement in present-day Kinabatangan, Sabah. Linguistic evidence does not support the view held commonly by the Brunei History Centre that "Kinabatangan" could mean "Chinese river". According to early accounts which survive only in copies dating back to the 19th century such as Salasilah Raja-Raja Brunei (Genealogy of the Brunei Kings) which was possibly first compiled during the reign of Sultan Muhammad Hassan (1582–1598) and subsequently copied and updated from time to time and also the Sejarah Melayu (written by Tun Seri Lanang in 1612), Ong Sum Ping "succeeded his father-in-law. He was known as Sultan Ahmad and ruled Brunei". This version, however, contradicts later account engraved on the Batu Tarsilah (Genealogical Tablet of the Sultans of Brunei) founded in 1807 that Sultan Ahmad was a brother of Sultan Muhammad Shah and he was not Ong Sum Ping. The latter version is the accepted official history of Brunei. During the Brunei Civil War (1661–1673), Sultan Muhyiddin of Brunei called for the assistance of Sultan of Sulu to help defeat Sultan Abdul Hakkul Mubin promising them independence as well as the territory of present-day (north-eastern) Sabah to be given to the Sultan of Sulu. The promised territory was or included Kinabatangan.

== Tomb ==
In the early 20th century, a Chinese trader, Huang Zhuoru 黄卓如 claimed that he visited the tomb of Ong Sum Ping located on a hill 1 li (about half km) from the Brunei capital at that time and there were Chinese inscriptions 黄总兵之墓 on the tombstone which meant 'Tomb of Commander Huang'. In another version of this story a Chinese trader from Guangzhou, Huang Qhuo Qi, allegedly discovered the tomb of Ong Sum Ping by accident in 1942, during a business trip to Brunei. However, the present whereabouts of this tomb is unknown and remains a mystery.

== Investigation ==
The only Malay source that mentions Ong Sum Ping, is the Salasilah Raja-Raja Brunei (Genealogy of the Brunei Kings). Ong Sum Ping and his variation counterparts are not mentioned in the Yuan (1279–1368) or Ming (1368–1644) dynasties' official Chinese sources. Yet Ong has been referred to in Borneo lore as, among other things, the admiral of Zheng He's fleet, the governor of a purported Yuan province in Sabah, a Ming dynasty ambassador, and many more. The current study critically assess the plausibility of these various identities formed by Chinese writers, particularly from the turn of the 20th century.

== Legacy ==
In 1947, a reef in the South China Sea for a short while was named 'Senping reef' 森屏礁 by the Government of the Republic of China in honour of Ong Sum Ping. In the Brunei capital of Bandar Seri Begawan, there is a street named after him, Jalan Ong Sum Ping, which is the only street in Brunei with a Chinese name.

== In popular culture ==
Ong Sum Ping has been repeatedly cited as one of the main subjects in the legend of Mount Kinabalu. The legend tells of two Chinese delegates of the Ming – Ong Sum Ping and his well-built assistant Wang Kong – sent to capture a precious gemstone from the mountain which was being guarded by a dragon. Using his wits, Ong Sum Ping swapped the pearl for a lit glass bottle. Wanting to get all the credit, Wang Kong snatched the retrieved treasure and ran away. Bitterly appalled by his trusted assistant's behaviour, Ong Sum Ping chose to stay behind in Brunei.

== Bibliography ==
- Lee, Khoon Choy (2013). Golden Dragon and Purple Phoenix: The Chinese and Their Multi-Ethnic Descendants in Southeast Asia. World Scientific. ISBN 978-981-4383-43-1.
