= Muhammad Hasan of Brunei =

Sultan of Brunei (r. 1582–1598)

Muhammad Hasan محمد حسن

Sultan of Brunei
- Reign: 1582–1598
- Predecessor: Shah Brunei
- Successor: Abdul Jalilul Akbar
- Died: c.1598 Istana Tanjong Kindana, Brunei
- Burial: Tanjong Kindana Royal Mausoleum, Brunei–Muara, Brunei
- Spouse: Puteri Sulu
- Issue Detail: Abdul Jalilul Akbar; Muhammad Ali; Ibrahim Ali Omar Shah; Muwallil Wasit I
Posthumous name
- Marhum di Tanjung (مرحوم د تنجوڠ)
- House: Bolkiah
- Father: Saiful Rijal
- Religion: Sunni Islam

Muhammad Hasan ibni Saiful Rijal (died c. 1598), posthumously known as Marhum di Tanjung, was the sultan of Brunei from 1582 to 1598. During his reign, the Bruneian Empire had full control of the island of Borneo and Northern Philippines, including Sulu.

== Reign ==
=== Early reign ===
Muhammad Hasan became the ninth sultan of Brunei upon his accession to the throne in 1582. By the end of his reign, Kota Batu featured two enclosed, square-shaped palaces. During his administration, palaces, mosques, and educational institutions were established to support the sultan’s governance and strengthen his connection with the people. He also commissioned the construction of a bridge linking Tanjong Kindana—also known as Tanjong Chendana—to the island and fortress on Pulau Chermin.

During his reign, Pengiran Di-Gadong and Pengiran Pemancha were appointed as new wazirs (viziers). He also played a significant role in defending Sunni Islam in the Philippine Islands. The title for foreign envoy was redefined as duta (ambassador) under his rule. His palace was protected by a fortified, four-square city equipped with artillery. He also commanded Pehin Orang Kaya Di-Gadong Seri Lela to lead a military campaign against Milau, a Kelabitic people in Sarawak. The rebellion was ultimately suppressed, and Milau surrendered to Bruneian forces.

=== Brunei–Pahang relations ===
Chinese chronicles from 1573 to 1619 highlighted the strong relationship between the sultanates of Pahang and Brunei. These accounts recount how a Bruneian sultan defended Pahang against a Johor invasion, helping the city survive. Given the marital ties between the royal families of the two sultanates, it is likely that this sultan was Muhammad Hasan. Another indication of the close bond between the two sultanates is Sultan Abdul Ghafur of Pahang's visit to Brunei, where he stayed with his wife.

Muhammad Hasan was able to adapt the Undang-Undang Melaka into the Hukum Kanun Pahang, facilitated by the close relationship between the two sultanates. However, this claim is somewhat tenuous, as the Kanun Brunei shares similarities with the Malaccan code in 21 of its 50 sections. The Kanun Brunei was comprehensive and modern for its time, covering a range of topics from royal etiquette to daily matters such as debt, bankruptcy, commerce, interest payments, defamation, theft, and even murder, all of which were crucial to public welfare. During the 15th and 16th centuries, Brunei's economy flourished, becoming a key commercial and Islamic hub for Borneo, as well as neighboring regions like the Philippines and Java. At the same time, both Brunei and Aceh were thriving, and in the Salasilah Raja-Raja Brunei, Muhammad Hasan and Iskandar Muda, were often compared, with both prioritising the adat (royal customs).

=== Death and his mausoleum ===
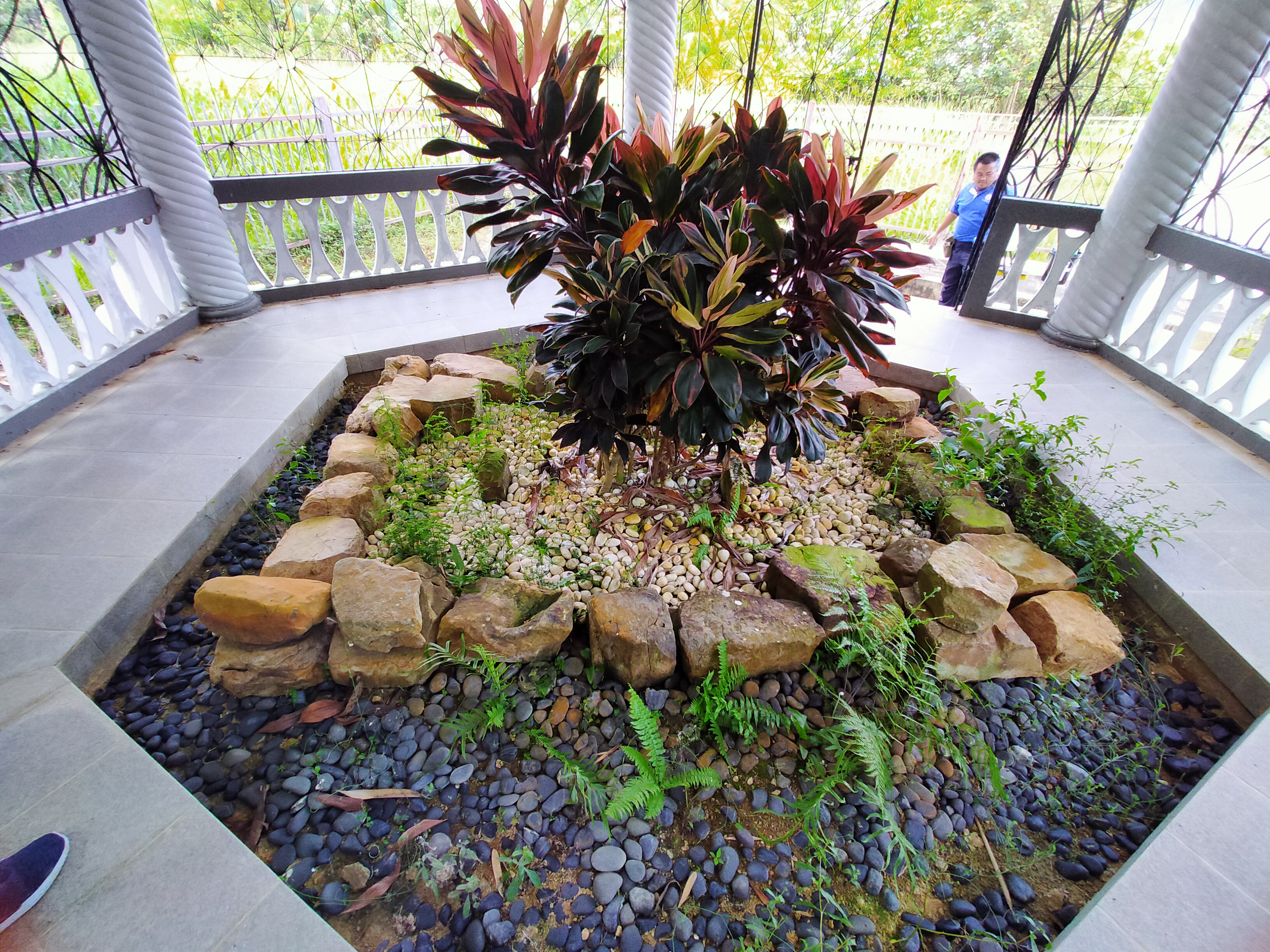
The resting place of Muhammad Hasan at the Tanjong Kindana

Muhammad Hasan died at Istana Tanjong Cheindana and was buried at Tanjung Chendana (also known as Tanjong Kindana) on Berambang Island in 1598. After his death, he was honoured with the posthumous title Marhum Di-Tanjung. His eldest son, Pengiran Muda Besar Abdul Jalilul Akbar, succeeded him as Sultan Abdul Jalilul Akbar and reigned until 1659. For his funeral, the body was brought to the mosque, where prayers were led by the Imam, Khatib, and Mudim. After the burial, a 20-day recitation of Quranic verses was held in his memory, followed by the talkin (a traditional Islamic death rite).

Following the funeral, religious leaders assembled to recite the dzikir 70,000 times in remembrance of the departed. Muhammad Hasan's family made sedekah forty days later with the hope that the blessings, or pahala, would help him in the hereafter. On this forty-first day, there was another recital of passages from the Quran. The nobat was silent throughout this time of grief. Forty days after Muhammad Hasan's death, Abdul Jalilul Akbar was crowned as the next sultan following the playing of the nobat. Commanders, subjects, the Pengiran Bendahara, Raja-Raja, Cheteria, and Manteri were among the high-ranking authorities that attended the ceremony.

There has been growing doubt about whether the tomb at Kampong Sungai Bunga, Tanjung Kindana truly belongs to Muhammad Hasan as no name inscription is present. Some claim to have seen a large gravestone with his name carved on it elsewhere on the hill. In response, Brunei History Centre (PSB) and related agencies launched a field investigation to search for the alleged gravestone and verify the tomb's authenticity in the 1990s. During the investigation near the current tomb at Sungai Bunga, researchers discovered evidence of an old Bruneian village, supported by oral history from local elder Buntar Ishak, who recalled remnants of old house posts before the Japanese occupation in the 1940s. Buntar affirmed that only one tomb exists in the area, and based on stories passed down from his ancestor Datu Safar, it belongs to Muhammad Hasan. His account is supported by historian Jamil Al-Sufri, who confirmed the tomb's authenticity despite the broken, un-inscribed gravestone, based on past research and testimony from a former Survey Department officer.

The current tomb, though lacking Quranic inscriptions typical of royal graves, shares several key features with known Bruneian royal tombs. These include a rectangular embankment (likely collapsed due to river erosion) and gravestones with traditional carvings found on sultans' tombs—particularly leaf motifs seen at other royal burial sites like those of Bolkiah and Omar Ali Saifuddin II. These similarities suggest the tomb likely belonged to royalty. The term "Tanjung Kindana" likely refers to a broader area that includes Sungai Bunga, making it plausible that the existing tomb there belongs to Muhammad Hasan. Pottery fragments and oral histories support the idea that the area was once a Bruneian settlement, possibly including the sultan's palace. Genealogical records further describe his powerful reign and grand residence in the region.

It is strongly believed that the current tomb at Sungai Bunga belongs to Muhammad Hasan. This is based on evidence that he likely lived in the area (supported by pottery finds indicating settlement), his posthumous title Marhum Di-Tanjung (linked to Tanjung Kindana), genealogical records, and expert writings noting that while his name is not inscribed on the gravestone, the tomb has long been accepted as his. As of 2016, remnants of the tomb and original gravestone still remain on the site.

== Personal life ==
Only Sultan Abdul Jalilul Akbar and Sultan Muhammad Ali are formally recognised as the legitimate sons of Muhammad Hasan. He also had two legitimate daughters: Pengiran Tuah, known for her immense wealth, and Raja Siti Nur Alam, who inherited from her aunt, Raja Retna. Abdul Jalilul Akbar, believed to be Muhammad Hasan's eldest son, was succeeded by his own son, Abdul Jalilul Jabbar. Pengiran Tuah married Pengiran Mohamed, who later became Pengiran Bendahara, and they were the parents of Abdul Hakkul Mubin. The succession became more complicated when Abdul Hakkul Mubin, Pengiran Tuah's third son, seized the throne—further entangling the family's claims to royal legitimacy.

In addition to these descendants, Muhammad Hasan had other sons who established their own legacies outside Brunei. Ibrahim Ali Omar Shah is recognised as the only sultan of Sarawak, while another son, Muwallil Wasit Bungsu, became the sultan of Sulu.

== Uncertainties ==
Both versions of the Salasilah Raja-Raja Brunei record that Muhammad Hasan conquered Sulu. In 1578, the Spanish commander Don Estevan Rodríguez de Figueroa seized the Sulu Archipelago, prompting the surrender of the Bruneian Adipati, Raja Iro (also spelled Ilo), who was the brother-in-law of Saiful Rijal. By the end of that year, Raja Iro and his followers had returned to Brunei, and Sulu was placed under Spanish control as an encomienda, assigned to Don Pedro de Oseguera and his son. This arrangement persisted until the early 17th century, when Brunei eventually regained control of the region.

In 1614, the Dutch admiral Laurens Reael met the “Young King of Sulu,” who made a lasting impression on him. This figure was none other than Raja Bongsu, the son of Muhammad Hasan and grandson of Raja Iro, indicating that Muhammad Hasan's reconquest of Sulu likely took place sometime before 1614. The Salasilah Raja-Raja Brunei also records that Raja Tengah, Muhammad Hasan's second son, was appointed governor of Sambas. Historian Teun A. van Dijk notes that in 1609, Adipati Tengah of Sambas rebelled against Brunei and sought help from the Dutch, a move that ultimately ended in failure by 1612.

== Legacy ==
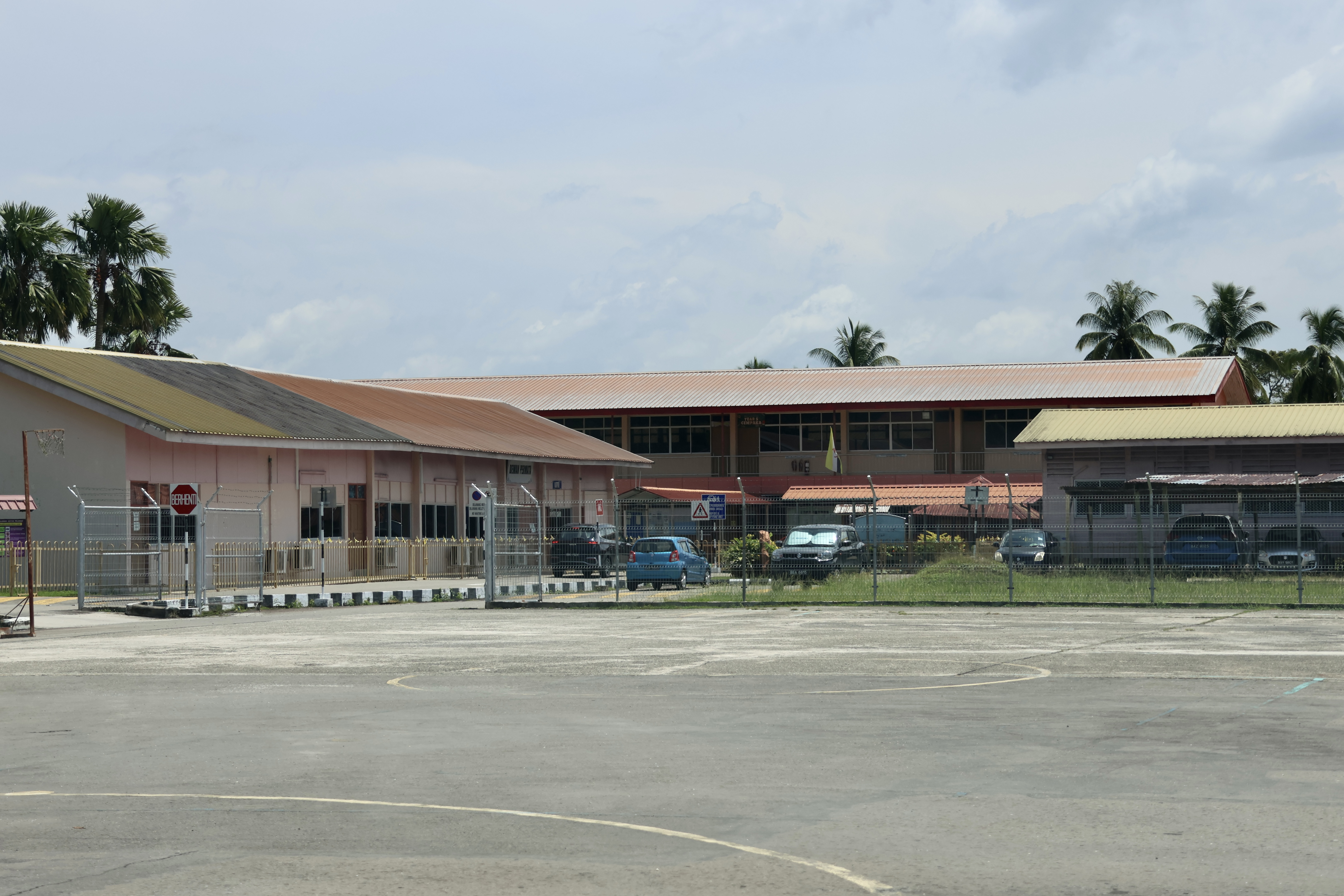
Sultan Hassan Primary School

=== Reputation ===
The Salasilah Raja-Raja Brunei notes that both Muhammad Hasan and Iskandar Muda of Acheh displayed a comparable degree of kekerasan (firmness), though it does not define the term explicitly. However, it is reasonable to interpret this as referring to their resolute leadership and ability to assert authority as heads of state. Muhammad Hasan, in particular, was praised in the Salasilah for his courage, sense of justice, and kindness toward his people. Historian Graham Saunders described him as "in many respects an enlightened ruler, with a broader interest in the world and an interest in theological debate."

Father Antonio Preira, a Jesuit who spent several months in Brunei due to the monsoon season, was deeply impressed by Muhammad Hasan's intellect and patience. According to the Salasilah, he also elevated the wealth and prestige of Brunei's royal customs. He maintained two palaces adorned with royal symbols and decorated his ceremonial hall, the Lapau, with the Sumbu Layang—a prominent emblem of monarchy.

=== Things named after him ===
- Sultan Hassan Secondary School, a school in Kampong Batu Apoi, Temburong District.
- Sultan Hassan Primary School, a school in Pekan Bangar, Temburong District.

Regnal titles
Preceded by Shah Brunei	Sultan of Brunei; 1582–1598	Succeeded by Abdul Jalilul Akbar
