= Chermin Island =

Islet at the mouth of the Brunei River

Native name: Pulau Chermin
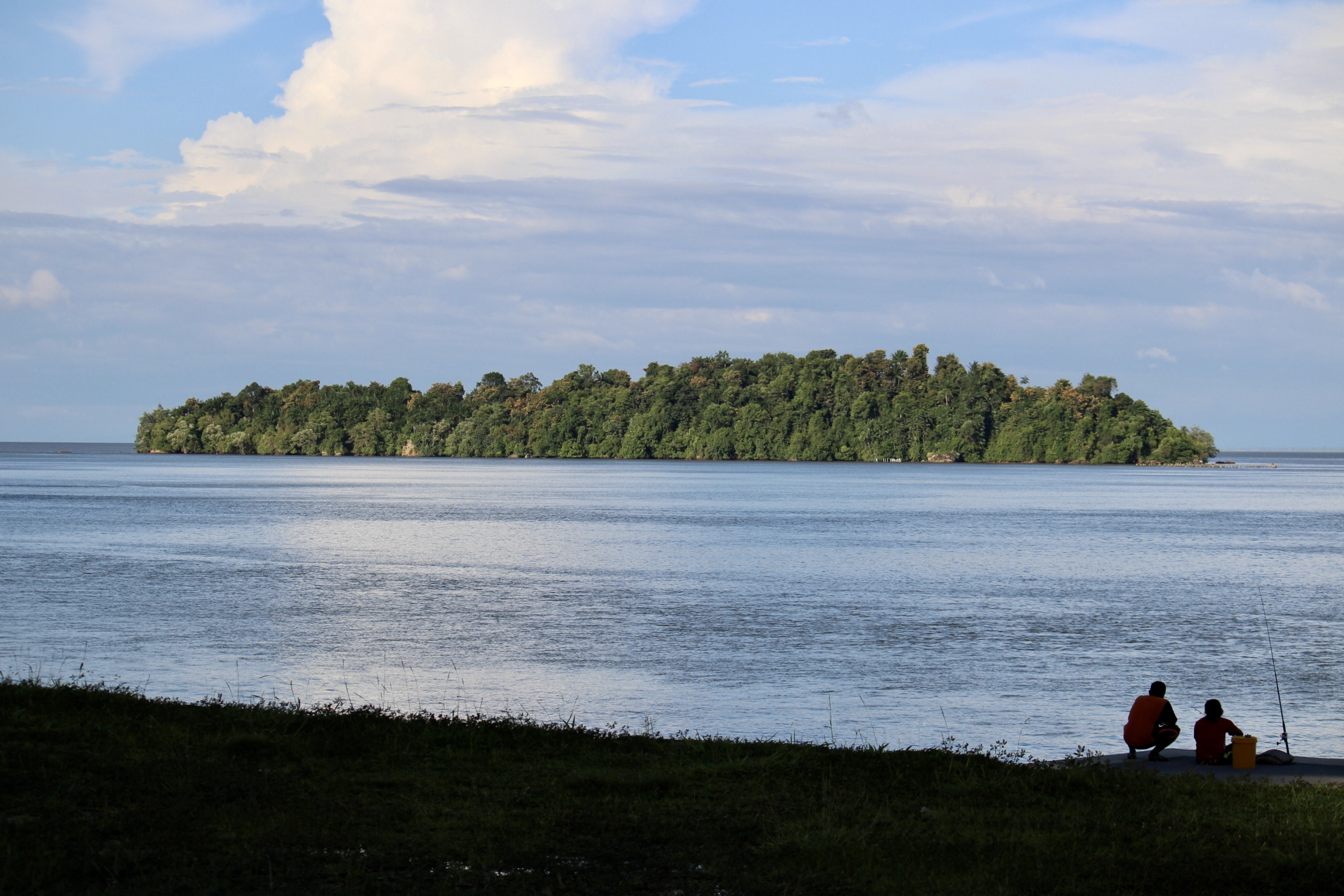
- The island in 2022

- Location in Brunei

Geography
- Location: Brunei Bay
- Coordinates: 4°55′47″N 115°1′30″E
- Archipelago: Malay Archipelago
- Area: 5 ha (12 acres)
- Highest elevation: 34 m (112 ft)

Administration
- Brunei
- District: Brunei–Muara
- Mukim: Kota Batu

Demographics
- Population: 0

Chermin Island (Malay: Pulau Chermin) (Note: Literally translates to "Mirror Island" in English.) is an islet at the mouth of the Brunei River in the Mukim Kota Batu, Brunei–Muara District, Brunei. Historically, it played a crucial role in Brunei's defence strategy, particularly after the devastating raids during the Castilian War in the late 16th century. The island was fortified as a bastion to protect the capital and surrounding areas from further invasions, strategically positioned near the narrow channel upstream from the former capital. Chermin Island served as a key defensive point during this period of political and military instability. It was later temporarily occupied by Sultan Abdul Hakkul Mubin as his palace following the assassination of Sultan Muhammad Ali, an event that sparked the Brunei civil war.

== Geography ==
Chermin Island, located at the mouth of the Brunei River, spans 5 hectares (12 acres) and lies within the secondary bay southwest of Brunei Bay. Historically, it was a fortified location with defences dating back to the late 17th century, guarding the passage to the river alongside Kaingaran Island situated approximately half a mile to the north. The bay's rugged escarpments and natural defensive features highlight its strategic significance.

Navigation around the island is aided by a red-and-white beacon positioned about 0.8 kilometres (0.50 mi) northeast. The island's geographical features, complemented by strategically placed beacons and navigational channels, are vital for guiding vessels through the intricate waterways leading to the Brunei River. Chermin Island is frequently wrongly believed to be a part of Brunei Town, which is now known as Bandar Seri Begawan, due to its close vicinity. The island, which rises to 34 metres (112 ft), is densely forested and characterised by steep terrain, dense jungle, and an abundance of crocodiles and snakes, which makes landing particularly difficult. The northern end of Chermin Island is marked by a large rock, and nearby is Chermin Rock, which is mostly underwater at less than two metres (six feet) deep.

The island's vegetation includes nipa trees on its eastern side, forming part of a mangrove ecosystem that also includes species such as Avicennia, Rhizophora, and Sonneratia. In 1990, the Universiti Brunei Darussalam (UBD) Biology Department recorded the Enhalus seagrass here. The rest of the island features primary forest growth, with limited sandy beaches and mostly muddy shores. Significant erosion is evident on the western side of the island. Although currently abandoned, Chermin Island is occasionally used as a leisure spot by sports fishermen.

== History ==
Ong Sum Ping (Note: Some scholars suggest that Ong Sum Ping in Brunei's royal genealogies are likely fictional figures, representing oral traditions about early Chinese presence rather than actual historical individuals.) migrated to Brunei with his followers, establishing Kota Batu as the royal palace complex, and constructed a stone barrier at Chermin Island to enhance the area's defences. Sultan Muhammad Hasan established his palace and tomb at Tanjong Kindana, at the entrance of the Brunei River. He fortified Chermin Island and constructed a bridge connecting his palace at Tanjong Kindana to the fort. The fort was further fortified with cannons produced during the reign of Sultan Shah Brunei and his own period of rule. Pengiran Kesuma Negara Pengiran Hashim states that 40 boats loaded with stones were sunk in order to begin building the stone fort between Chermin Island and Keingaran Island.

The administrative seat of Brunei was relocated from Kota Batu to Chermin Island, which is situated at the mouth of Brunei River, during the civil war (1661–1673) between Sultans Muhiyddin and Abdul Hakkul Mubin. A palace and several houses were proposed on the island by the Pengiran Bendahara and later ordered by the Pehin Orang Kaya Digadong Seri Nara. Mubin then relocated the administrative capital from Kota Batu to the island during his reign, while the Pengiran Bendahara did not. Mubin relocated to the island under the guidance of the newly appointed Pengiran Bongsu (later Muhyiddin), hoping to wait out the brewing crisis. After relocating, Muhyiddin declared himself as the 14th sultan of Brunei, with his authority around Kampong Ayer, thus sparking a civil war in the country.

Mubin fought the war from Chermin Island, which he had fortified to protect himself. Forces from Muhyiddin arrived on the island with the help of a troop from the sultan of Sulu. No fighting took place, as most of the islands fortifications were destroyed by a bombardment executed earlier by Tanjong Kindana. The island's fort was taken, and Mubin was put to death. Mubin disposed of most of the royal regalia by loading them into a cannon and firing them into Brunei Bay. It is claimed that he was buried on the island.

Sultan Muhammad Alam was allegedly assassinated by a hired killer on Chermin Island in 1828, marking the end of another civil war. However, historian Jamil Al-Sufri questions this account due to a lack of evidence. An alternative version suggests he voluntarily left Brunei and moved to Putatan in Sabah, where a gravestone is believed to mark his burial. While there is no proof he was buried on Chermin Island, the gravestone closely resembles other royal tombstones in Brunei.

The mouth of the Brunei River, between Chermin Island and Muara, was thoroughly surveyed in 1926 by a team from HMS Herald (1923). On the evening of 27 December 1958, while travelling downstream from Brunei Town with a pilot on board, the SS Juno struck the turning light beacon off Chermin Island, causing the structure to collapse. In 1992, the island was studied by the UBD Biology Department, which recommended its preservation for its rich sediment, wildlife, and plant life. Additionally, the island has potential as an archaeological site for tourists if the historically significant fortifications once standing there are rebuilt. As of 2000, Chermin Island has been gazetted under the Antiquities and Treasure Trove Act. The island has been depicted on the reverse side of the B$100 note since 2004.

== See also ==
- List of islands of Brunei

== Bibliography ==
- Forrest, Thomas (1779). A voyage to New Guinea and the Moluccas, from Balambangan : including an account of Magindano, Sooloo, and other islands ... performed in the Tartar Galley, belonging to the Honourable East India company, during the years 1774, 1775, and 1776. Dublin : Price, W. and H. Whitestone, [etc.,etc.], University of California Libraries – via Internet Archive.
- Asbol Mail; Zaidul Anwar (2016). "Sultan Muhammad Alam @ Raja Api (1826–1828): Roles and Civil War An Early Analysis". Jurnal Darussalam. 16. Bandar Seri Begawan: Brunei History Centre – via ResearchGate.
- Bala, Bilcher (2005). Thalassocracy: A History of the Medieval Sultanate of Brunei Darussalam. Kota Kinabalu: School of Social Sciences. ISBN 978-983-2643-74-6 – via ResearchGate.
- Galt, Annabelle; Sigaty, Todd; Vinton, Mark, eds. (September 2000). The World Commission on Protected Areas 2nd Southeast Asia Regional Forum Pakse, Lao PDR, 6-11 December, 1999. Volume II - Papers Presented. Vientiane: IUCN.
- Haji Sulaiman Haji Duraman (2009). Kenali Negara Kita (in Malay). Bandar Seri Begawan: Dewan Bahasa dan Pustaka Brunei. ISBN 978-99917-0-638-2.
- Kurz, Johannes L. (15 July 2018). "Making History in Borneo: Ong Sum Ping and His Others During the Late Yuan and Early Ming Dynasties". International Journal of Asia Pacific Studies. 14 (2): 79–104. doi:10.21315/ijaps2018.14.2.4.
- Leake, David (1989). Brunei: The Modern Southeast-Asian Islamic Sultanate. Jefferson: McFarland and Company. doi:10.2307/2058335. ISBN 978-0-89950-434-6. JSTOR 2058335.
- Low, Hugh (1880). "Sĕlĕsîlah (book of the Descent) of the Rajas of Bruni". Journal of the Straits Branch of the Royal Asiatic Society (5). Straits Branch of the Royal Asiatic Society: 1–35. ISSN 2304-7534. JSTOR 41560643. Archived from the original on 8 September 2025.
- Muhammad A. Rahman (1966). Rangkaian tawarikh Negeri Sabah. Singapore: Al-Ahmadiah Press.
- Ooi, Keat Gin; King, Victor T. (2023). Routledge Handbook of Contemporary Brunei. Abingdon: Routledge. doi:10.4324/9781003020431. ISBN 978-1-000-56864-6.
- Pehin Jawatan Dalam Seri Maharaja Dato Seri Utama Dr. Haji Awang Mohd. Jamil Al-Sufri (2002). Survival of Brunei: A Historical Perspective. Bandar Seri Begawan: Brunei History Centre. ISBN 978-99917-34-18-7.
- Pengiran Dato Seri Setia Dr Haji Mohammad bin Pengiran Haji Abdul Rahman (2007). Islam di Brunei Darussalam Zaman British (1774-1984) (in Malay). Bandar Seri Begawan: Dewan Bahasa dan Pustaka Brunei. ISBN 978-99917-0-557-6.
- Pretty, E. E. F. (1928). Colonial Reports – Annual: State of Brunei Report for 1927. Singapore: His Majesty's Stationery Office.
- Rivers, P. J. (2004). "The Origin of 'Sabah' and a Reappraisal of Overbeck as Maharajah". Journal of the Malaysian Branch of the Royal Asiatic Society. 77 (1 (286)). Malaysian Branch of the Royal Asiatic Society: 67–99. ISSN 0126-7353. JSTOR 41493515. Archived from the original on 7 March 2023.
- Rozan Yunos (24 August 2008). "Civil war wrecks chaos in the country". www.bt.com.bn. The Brunei Times. Archived from the original on 14 June 2012.
- Saunders, Graham (2002). A History of Brunei (2nd ed.). Abingdon: RoutledgeCurzon. ISBN 978-1-136-87394-2.
- Silvestre, G.; H.J.H. Matdanan; P.H. Y. Sharifuddin; M.W.R.N. De Silva; T.-E. Chua, eds. (1992). "The coastal resources of Brunei Darussalam: status, utilization and management". ICLARM Conference Proceedings 34. Department of Fisheries and International Center for Living Aquatic Resources Management. ISBN 978-971-8709-11-5.
- State of Brunei Annual Report 1958. London: Her Majesty's Stationery Office. 1959.
- State of Brunei Annual Report 1961-62. London: Her Majesty's Stationery Office. 1964.
- State of Brunei Annual Report 1966. London: Her Majesty's Stationery Office. 1968.
- Vienne, Marie-Sybille de (2015). Brunei: From the Age of Commerce to the 21st Century. Translated by Emilia Lanier. Singapore: NUS Press. ISBN 978-9971-69-818-8.
