= Ibrahim Ali Omar Shah =

Sultan of Sarawak (r. 1599–1641)

1st Sultan of Sarawak
- Reign: 1599–1641
- Predecessor: Title established
- Successor: Title abolished
- Born: Brunei
- Died: 1641; Batu Buaya, Santubong, Sarawak
- Burial: Kampong Batu Buaya, Santubong, Sarawak
- Spouse: Puteri Surya Kesuma; Puteri Matan
- Issue: Sultan Muhammad Shafiyuddin; Pengiran Badaruddin; Pengiran Abdul Wahab; Pengiran Mangku Negara; Radin Rasmi Puteri; Radin Ratna Dewi
Regnal name
- Sultan Ibrahim Ali Omar Shah Ibni Al-Marhum Sultan Muhammad Hasan
- House: Bolkiah
- Father: Sultan Muhammad Hasan
- Religion: Sunni Islam

Ibrahim Ali Omar Shah Ibni Muhammad Hassan (died 1641), also known as Sultan Tengah or Raja Tengah, was the first and only sultan of the Sultanate of Sarawak. He is the son of Sultan Muhammad Hasan of Brunei.

== Reign ==
=== Establishment and accession ===
The Salasilah Raja-Raja Brunei, 'Royal Genealogy of Brunei' have written stories about him, although some have added to and varied from the originals. In the genealogy version of Datu Imam Ya'akub and Khatif Haji Abdul Latif, Pengiran Raja Tengah Ibrahim Ali Omar Shah is the son of Sultan Muhammad Hasan and was crowned king of Sambas in addition to being the Sultan of Sarawak, is extensively described in the genealogy version of Pehin Orang Kaya Digadong. He was commonly recognised as the son or grandchild of Sultan Abdul Jalilul Akbar. However, Sambas's sources gave the precise birth date of his son, Raden Sulaiman, as 14 April 1601.

His father, Sultan Muhammad Hassan, was Brunei's ninth Sultan from 1582 to 1598. At his death, he was succeeded by Ibrahim Ali Omar Shah's brother, Sultan Abdul Jalilul Akbar. Sultan Abdul Jalilul Akbar may have anticipated the rivalry between him and his brother, which may have contributed to the creation of the Sultanate of Sarawak. Consequently, he named his younger brother Sultan of Sarawak, taking into account the fact that Sarawak is a remote region of Brunei. Pengiran Raja Tengah Ibrahim Ali Omar Shah, was proclaimed the first Sultan of Sarawak by his brother, Sultan Abdul Jalilul Akbar, in 1599.

Heading off for Sarawak, Sultan Ibrahim Ali Omar Shah took a total of one thousand men (Brunei people who reside in Kampong Saba) with him. These troops are made up of Sakai, Kedayan, and Bunut, three natives of Sarawak. Not only that, but he was also joined by Brunei's royal kin, who helped Sarawak establish a government. Bukit Bedil (Bedil Hill) in Santubong was the location of the first palace. The Sarawak sultanate's administrative hub was decided to be in the Santubong region. According to the Diraja Sambas account, the Sultan identified himself as Sultan Ibrahim Ali Omar Shah or Sultan Abdul Jalil.

=== Relations with Sukadana and Sambas ===
When Sultan Ibrahim Ali Omar Shah traveled to Johore-Penang, he went to see his mother and ordered the establishment of the Sultanate of Sarawak, which was headed by four state ministers who were Dato Patinggi Seri Setia (Datu Patinggi), Dato Shahbandar Indera Wangsa (Datu Shahbandar), Dato Amar Seri Diraja (Datu Amar) and Dato Temenggong Laila Wangsa (Datu Temenggong). It was rumoured that the Sultan was expelled from Johor for hitting a dancer after a handkerchief accidentally struck his face during a performance. Sultan Abdul Ghafur Muhiuddin Shah, who was still in charge of Johor at the moment, became enraged at this deed and drove the Sarawakin Sultan back home. On the other hand, some accusations state that the Sultan's expulsion from Johor resulted from his unwillingness to grant his mother's wish for him to wed Princess Cik Zohra. The Raja Bonda of Pahang at the time was the brother of the Sultan.

A typhoon struck Sultan Ibrahim Ali Omar Shah's ship on the way back to Sarawak as well, carrying them to the Sukadana (West Kalimantan) kingdom. At that time, King Digiri Mustika of Sukadana provided service to the entourage of the Sultan of Sarawak, leading to his eventual conversion to Islam and becoming Sultan Muhammad Shafiuddin. While awaiting a safe circumstance in the Strait of Melaka, the Sarawakian Sultan wed Puteri Surya Kesuma, the younger sister of King Sukadana, and resided in Sukadana for a while, teaching the local populace. The Sultan made the decision to temporarily reside in the Sukadana Sultanate following his marriage in order to assess the safety conditions around the Melaka Strait. Their only son named Sulaiman was born.

Sultan Ibrahim Ali Omar Shah made the decision to leave the Sukadana Sultanate and relocate to the Sambas River region after around 7 years of settlement there, as the conditions near the Melaka Strait remained dangerous. With forty boats fully armed, the Sultan departed Sukadana in 1638 and made his way to Panembahan Sambas on the Sambas River. King of Panembahan Sambas at the time, Ratu Sapudak, gave the Sultan's delegation a warm reception. Ratu Sapudak then gave his approval for the Sultan to relocate to an area close to the Panembahan Sambas administrative headquarters. Soon after, Ratu Sapudak died, and Raden Kencono took the throne, assuming the name Ratu Anom Kesumayuda.

The eldest son of Sulaiman was married to Mas Ayu Bungsu, the youngest daughter of the late Ratu Sapudak, around ten years after the family moved to Panembahan Sambas. After that, Panembahan Sambas gave Sulaiman the title of Raden, allowing him to dwell there with Mas Ayu Bungsu as Raden Sulaiman. Raden Sulaiman's first child, Raden Bima, was born into his marriage to Mas Ayu Bungsu. Then, along with Adinda Ratu Anom Kesumayuda called Raden Aryo Mangkurat, Raden Sulaiman was named by Ratu Anom Kesumayuda as one of the Ministers of Panembahan Sambas. Raden Sulaiman eventually relocated to Kota Bandir and founded an Islamic empire there under the name Sultan Muhammad Shafiyuddin as a consequence of a disagreement with Pengiran Mangkurat, the first Vizier of Sambas. The genealogy also describes how Raden Bima, the prince of Raden Sulaiman, faced Sultan Muhyiddin in Gelagak (Kalakah) and was then taken to Brunei where he was crowned Sultan of Sambas, succeeding his father as Sultan Anom.

Sultan Ibrahim Ali Omar Shah made the decision to go back to Sarawak soon after he noticed that the area around the Melaka Strait had become safer and that his son Raden Sulaiman had married and taken on the role of Minister of Panembahan Sambas. The Sultan returned to Sarawak in 1652, accompanied by his wife Puteri Surya Kesuma and her four children (Badaruddin, Abdul Wahab, Rasmi Puteri, and Ratna Dewi). The Sultan lived at Matan, also known as Sukadana, for at least ten years, based on the number of children born to the Sultan. Following that, the Sultan established a settlement at Kota Bangun and relocated to Sambas with his family.

=== Death and tomb ===
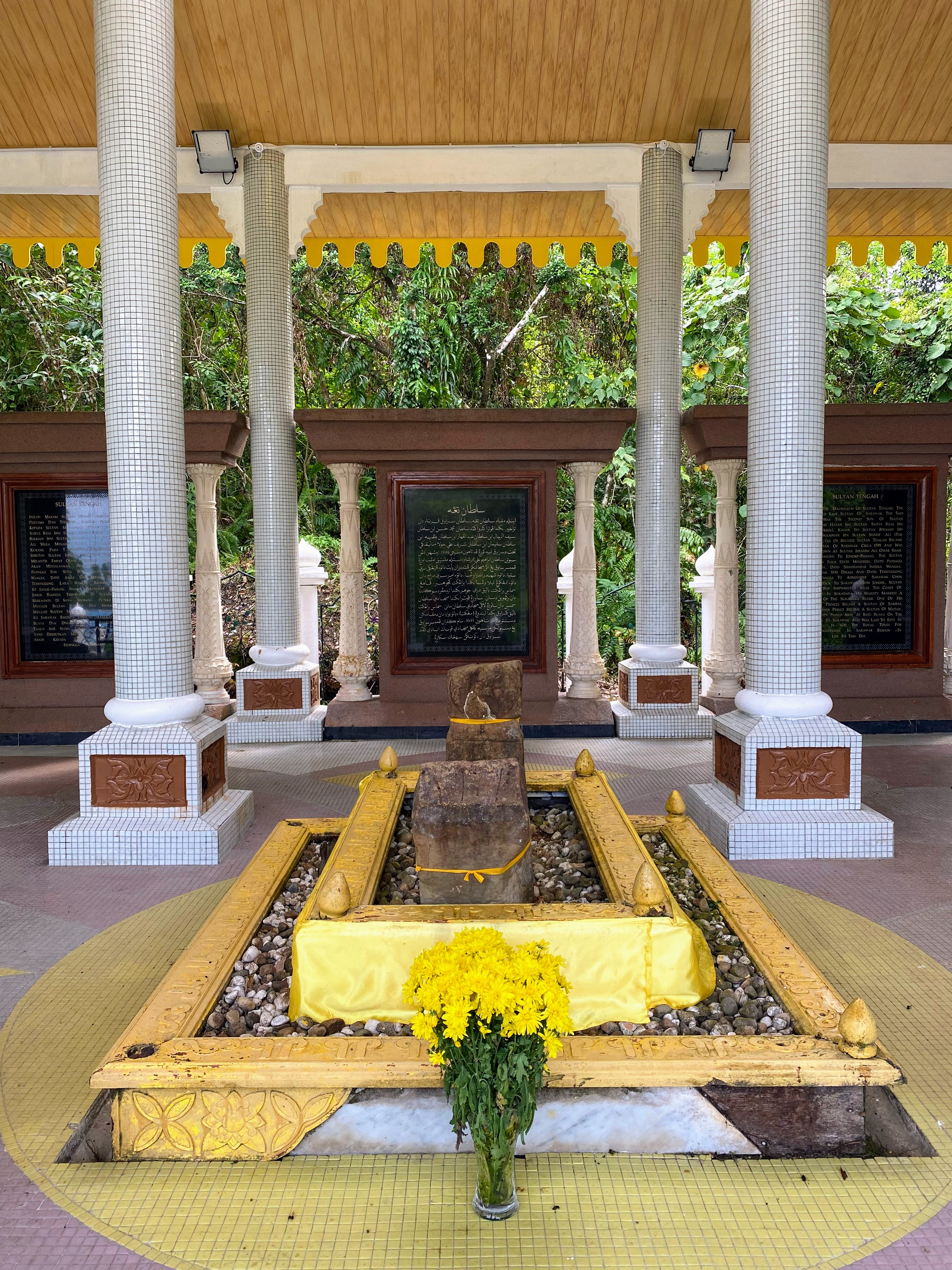
Mausoleum of Sultan Tengah in Santubong, Sarawak

Ibrahim Ali Omar Shah married the princess of Ratu Sambas in Sambas on his visit, this time having a son named Radin Bima. He was wounded by a Sakai with a broken harpoon as he paused to relieve himself at Kampung Batu Buaya on his way back to Sarawak. He died soon after and was buried at Sematan, Sarawak in 1641. Following his death, the Sultan's remains were interred atop Bukit Santubong's slopes in accordance with the customs and tradition of the Sarawak Sultanate.

Following the Sultan's death, the four state ministers assumed control of the area. The titles bestowed upon Sarawak's nobilities after his passing have persisted to this day. Sarawak was ruled by the four native datu until the first White Rajahs came in 1842, according to tradition, following the death of Ibrahim Ali Omar Shah. Two princes of Ibrahim Ali Omar Shah, known by their titles Pengiran Mangku Negara and Radin Bima, respectively, were summoned by Sultan Muhyiddin to bestow them with titles and governing authority. Radin Bima assumed the title of Sultan Anum and was crowned Sultan of Sambas.

After the death of Ibrahim Ali Omar Shah, the Sultan's wife and her four kids went back to Sukadana. Sultan Sukadana gave Raden Badaruddin the name Pengiran Mangkunegara (Mangku Negara), which he eventually changed to Penambahan (Sultan) Sukadana. Raden Badaruddin traveled to Brunei at that time in order to see Sultan Muhyiddin. It is hardly unexpected that the tale of Raden Sulaiman in Sambas has been recounted in such detail and in such length because the author of the Salasilah Raja-Raja Brunei is the Sultan of Sambas himself. Among these is the tale of Raden Sulaiman being named by Ratu Anum Kesukma Yudha as the second Vizier.

The Sarawak State Government declared on 11 March 1993, that a tomb had been found in a woodland area close to the intersection of Jalan Damai and Santubong in Kuching. Sultan Ibrahim Ali Omar Shah was later identified to be buried at the mausoleum. Makam Sultan Tengah became one of the primary destination on the list of historical sites in Sarawak. Furthermore, this tomb is a valuable resource for political scientists and historians as it provides a comprehensive understanding of Sarawak's social and historical background at that era.

The oldest tomb in the nation, is accessible to the public for free every day from 8 a.m. to 5 p.m., according to the Sarawak Museum Department. The position posted on Facebook, stating, "The department held a mutual cooperation to clean it to give comfort to visitors for the reopening of the meal." In August 2007, Sultan Hassanal Bolkiah paid a visit to the tomb at Santubong while he was in Sarawak.

== Legacy ==
Directed by Zakaria Hassan, a musical about Sultan Tengah would have its city debut at Stadium Perpaduan on 21–23 September 2018. The musical's production, which stars Fahrin Ahmad as Sultan Tengah and Mahmud Ali Basah as Sultan Abdul Jalil Akbar, is open to the public. A combined orchestra of thirty professional musicians from Kuching North City Commission (DBKU) will also play during the two-day theater event.

In 2020, the Sarawak Malaysian Islamic Party (PAS) endeavored to utilize Darul Hana to depict the state of Sarawak as a component of the history for the Sarawak Malays. They contended that the Malay chiefs chosen by the Brooke administration and subsequently the Crown Colony of Sarawak uphold the tradition of Sultan Tengah.

Jalan Sultan Tengah, a road in Kuching, commemorates his name.
