= Husin Kamaluddin =

Sultan of Brunei

Husin Kamaluddin حسين کمال‌‌الدین

Sultan of Brunei
- Second Reign: 1737–1740
- Predecessor: Muhammad Alauddin
- Successor: Omar Ali Saifuddin I
- First Reign: 1710–1730
- Predecessor: Nasruddin
- Successor: Muhammad Alauddin
- Died: c. 1770; Pulau Luba, Brunei Town, Bruneian Empire
- Burial: Makam di Luba, Bandar Seri Begawan, Brunei
- Spouse: Puteri Raja Buwono Maimun (Royal Princess of Mataram Java)
- Issue: Pengiran Anak Untong; Pengiran Anak Badaruddin
Regnal name
- Sultan Husin Kamaluddin ibnu Sultan Muhammad Ali
- House: Bolkiah
- Father: Sultan Muhammad Ali
- Religion: Sunni Islam

Husin Kamaluddin ibnu Muhammad Ali (Note: Likely supposed to be pronounced and spelt "Hussein" and not "Husin") (died c. 1770) or also known as Sultan Kamaluddin Malik Al Dzahir, was the 16th Sultan of Brunei. Following his death, he was posthumously given the title of Marhum Di Luba as he lives at Luba. He is descended from the 12th Sultan of Brunei, Sultan Muhammad Ali, as the second son. The nation flourished during his rule, food was easily obtained, and he also introduced Brunei pitis, the nation's first unit of money. Additionally, he is the only sultan to have held the throne twice.

Within the grounds of the Royal Mausoleum (Royal Mausoleum) is a 4 foot (1.2 m)-tall stone known as the Batu Tarsilah. The names of all of Brunei's monarchs from Muhammad Shah to Muhammad Tajuddin, are inscribed on the stone, which was built by two muslim scholars, Datu Imam Yaakub and Pehin Khatib Haji Abdul Latif, at the request of the country's 14th and 16th Sultans, Sultans Muhyiddin and Husin Kamaluddin.

== Background ==
The 1783 London publication, "Oriental Repertory, Vol. I," by Alexander Dalrymple, provided a crucial English source for the name Husin (Usseen) of Sultan Husin Kamaluddin, who was previously only identified as Sultan Kamaluddin in the Genealogy of the Sultans of Brunei. This source supported the notion that there is a solid historical foundation for the occasional usage of Husin Kamaluddin's name. As a consequence, the source genuinely validates every study finding the Brunei History Centre has produced throughout the years about the Sultanate of Brunei.

== Early life ==
After his father and siblings were massacred, which led to the outbreak of the Bruneian civil war, Husin Kamaluddin, the younger of Sultan Muhammad Ali's two baby sons, was spared. The Islamic aqidah was propagated by him, who studied diligently. All of his efforts were focused on the hereafter, which he preferred.

== Reign ==
=== First reign (1710–1730) ===
Husin Kamaluddin first ascended the throne in 1710 succeeding his cousin, Sultan Nasruddin and ruled until his abdication in 1730. He was reportedly fairly old when he succeeded Sultan Nasruddin to the throne, yet he was regarded as a kind, moral, and religious man. Husin Kamaluddin appointed his son, Pengiran Anak Untong, as Raja of Dumpil Meruntum, Sabah in 1730. The Sultan continued the usage of Brunei pitis. Additionally, gold pitis coins were minted that contained a picture of a cat and the Sultan's title, Sultan Kamaluddin Malik Al Dzahir. Also in 1730, he regained lost Sarawak Proper from Sambas which was lost in 1609.

=== Second reign (1737–1740) ===
Seven years after his coronation, Sultan Muhammad Alauddin died when his heir apparent was still a baby in 1737. Husin Kamaluddin was therefore asked to take up the role as heir apparent. Sultan Hussin Kamaluddin ascended to the throne for the second time until his abdication in 1740. Husin Kamaluddin was adamant about denying his successors the crown, claiming Sultan Muhyiddin's lineage deserved it more for their efforts during the Bruneian civil war. Following this, Pengiran Anak Untong, his son moved to Sabah and made his home on the land that his father had given him, known as Dumpil Meruntum.

=== Death ===
Husin Kamaluddin died at Pulau Luba in 1770. After his death, he was known as Marhum Di Luba. Pengiran Muda Tengah Omar Ali Saifuddin was then granted the sultanate of Brunei by Sultan Hussin Kamaluddin. Pengiran Muda Tengah Omar Ali Saifuddin became Sultan Omar Ali Saifuddin I in 1740.

== Personal life ==
Several princesses, rather than a single prince, were part of Sultan Husin Kamaluddin's lineage, resulting in his direct descendants being unable to inherit the throne. Husin Kamaluddin have several non-gahara (pure royal lineage) sons, including:

- Pengiran Anak Untong (born 1710), died in Putatan
- Pengiran Anak Badaruddin

Legend has it that Sultan Husin Kamaluddin enjoyed going fishing with the locals along the Brunei River's upper banks, particularly in the region along the river that runs upstream to the Makam di Luba. He would frequently bring what was known as tubal wood, which was later called pupuh-pupuh and kept in a tin.

== Tomb ==
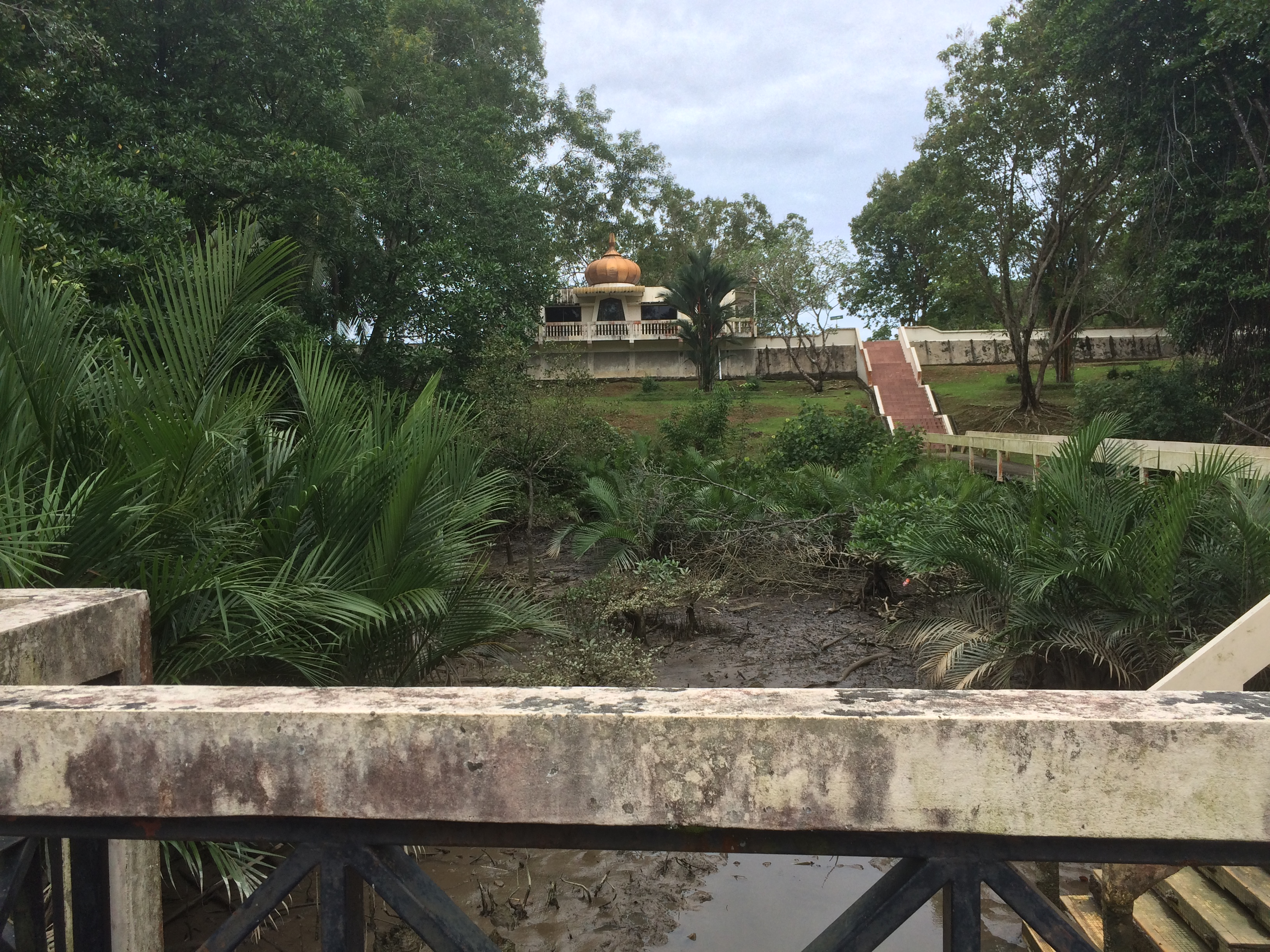
Mausoleum of Husin Kamaluddin at Makam di Luba in 2016

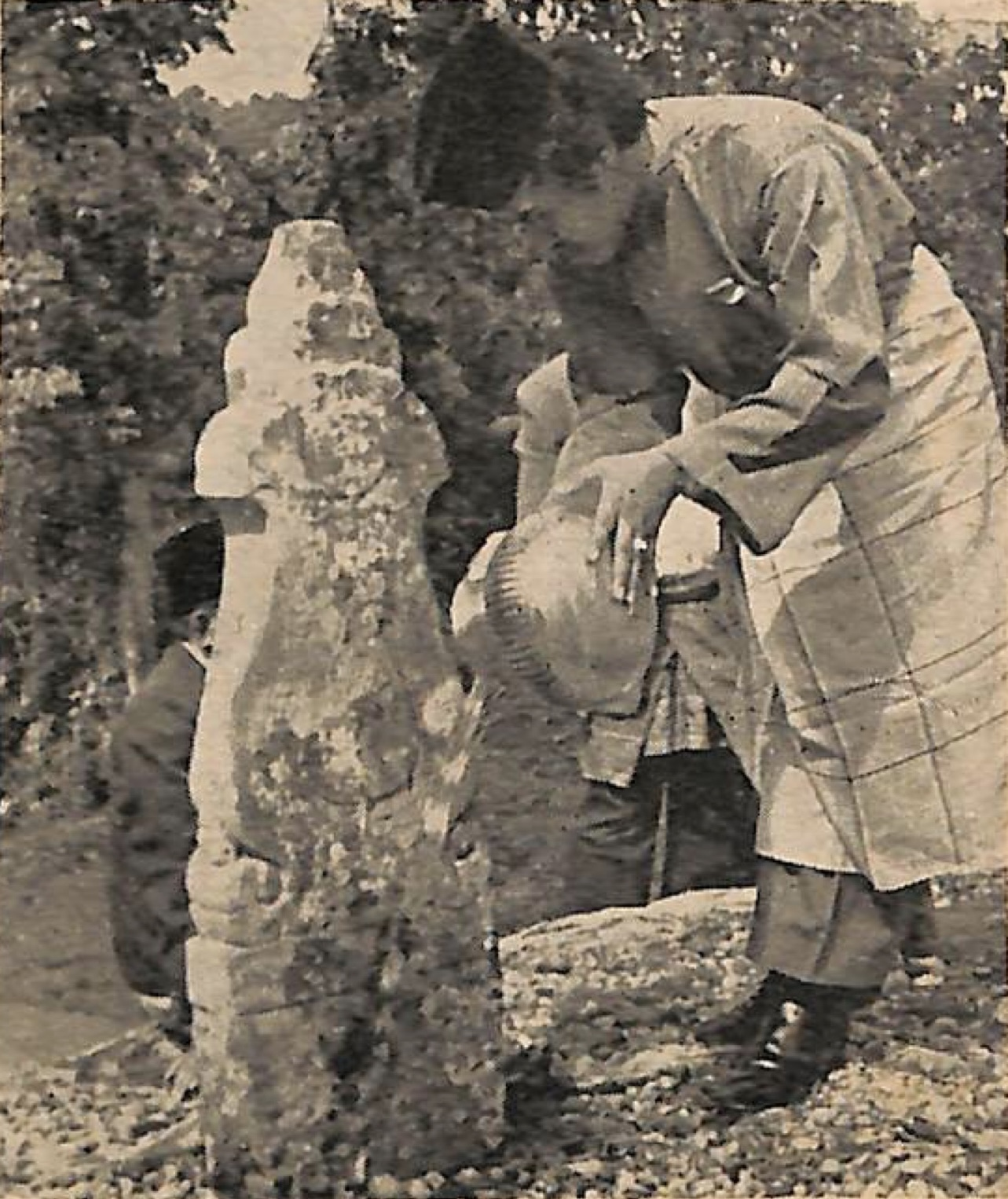
Prince Mohamed Bolkiah pouring the "ayeng asah-asahan" onto the tombstone of Husin Kamaluddin

The Tomb of Sultan Husin Kamaluddin, also called Makam di Luba (because of its location on the island of Pulau Luba, which divides the Damuan River from the Brunei River), is situated in Kampong Bunut Perpindahan. The bridge, which was constructed to facilitate tomb visits, is frequently the center of attention for fishermen. In addition, the proboscis monkey, a type of monkey, lives in the marshy areas of Luba Island. The tomb has since been under the protection of the Antiquities and Treasure Trove Act, 1967 revised 1984, 1990 and 2002.

== Suit of armour ==
A mystery suit of armour was discovered in Raja Aini Rahman's residence in 2004. The then 66-year-old retiree claimed she had to protect the artifact and give it back to its owner, but she would not elaborate on how the armour got into her possession. The chain mail armor, which included a helmet and one gauntlet, was confirmed by Muzium Negara in 2014, according to Raja Aini. In response to questions from NST, a spokesperson at Muzium Negara stated that the study just described the artifacts and did not determine their validity. According to the story, the helmet and gauntlet were embellished with pitis and a combination of six materials, including rubies, gold, silver, copper, iron, and tin, were used to make the armour.

Raja Aini said that after engaging brokers, she was unable to return the armour to Brunei. In 2007, she said, a delegation from Brunei led by a man she called Pehin Jamil Al-Sufri examined the armour. She mentioned that in 2007, a team from Brunei consisting of specialists in history, Jawi, jewelry, and armor verified the authenticity of the armour. She pleaded with the Bruneian authorities to retrieve the armour in time for Ramadan. On 14 April 2022, family friend Aina Belle posted an update on Instagram Story, stating, "Brunei officials have now contacted us. I sincerely appreciate your support, everyone."

== See also ==
- List of sultans of Brunei

== Notes ==
Regnal titles
Preceded by Muhammad Alauddin; Nassaruddin	Sultan of Brunei; 1737–1740; 1710–1730	Succeeded by Omar Ali Saifuddin I Muhammad Alauddin
