= Nasruddin of Brunei =

Sultan of Brunei (r. 1690–1710)

Nasruddin نصر الدين

Sultan of Brunei
- Reign: 1690–1710
- Predecessor: Muhyiddin
- Successor: Husin Kamaluddin
- Died: 1710; Kianggeh, Brunei
- Burial: Kianggeh Royal Mausoleum, Bandar Seri Begawan, Brunei
Posthumous name
- Marhum di Kianggeh (مرحوم د كياڠڬيه)
- House: Bolkiah
- Father: Pengiran Muda Besar Abdullah
- Mother: Pengiran Anak Besar
- Religion: Islam

Nasruddin ibni Pengiran Muda Besar Abdullah (Note: His full name was "Sultan Nasruddin ibni Pengiran Muda Besar Abdullah ibni Sultan 'Abdul Jalilul Akbar." His given name was occasionally spelled as "Nassaruddin". After his passing, he was posthumously honoured with the title "Marhum di Kianggeh.") (died 1710) was the sultan of Brunei from 1690 to 1710, and the grandson of Abdul Jalilul Akbar. Nasruddin is described as a smart monarch who was very interested in state government and administration.

== Reign (1690–1710) ==
=== Succession ===
Nasruddin's succession to the throne was unsurprising due to his active role in governance and war planning under Sultan Muhyiddin during the 12-year-long Bruneian civil war. Although Raja Bendahara was the expected successor, his prior death left the position open. Furthermore, Nasruddin's father, Pengiran Muda Besar Abdullah ibni Sultan Abdul Jalilul Akbar, was the elder and a respected figure, making Nasruddin a legitimate heir in line with Brunei's royal traditions.

=== Involvement of Dato Godam ===
During Nasruddin's reign around 1691, a Minangkabau nobleman named Dato Godam, a descendant of Bendahara Tanjung Sungayang from Sumatra, arrived in Brunei. His father, Bendahara Harun, had married a Dutch woman, which led to Dato Godam facing discrimination. Although he was meant to succeed his father, the Minangkabau people, known for their strict adherence to customs, rejected him, insisting he was not a true Minangkabau. Feeling deeply humiliated, Dato Godam chose to leave and sought refuge in Sarawak. Realising his son's absence, Bendahara Harun later sent a search party to locate him.

While in Sarawak, Dato Godam encountered Pengiran Temenggong Pengiran Abdul Kadir, who had left Brunei after the sultan, Nasruddin, had taken his daughter in marriage. Despite the honour of being related to the sultan, Pengiran Temenggong was deeply troubled, as his daughter's marriage brought her only sadness and hardship. When he approached the sultan, he openly shared his sorrow and reluctance, which moved Nasruddin. Although the sultan sympathised with his plight, he felt unable to change the situation. Pengiran Temenggong explained that he was not ungrateful for the sultan’s favour but had come to seek permission to settle in Sarawak. He recalled how Nasruddin had once saved him from drowning in the river, an act that he regarded as a great honour. However, despite the prestige of the sultan's gift, he compared it to a fine meal that still left an uneasy feeling, symbolising his discomfort with his daughter’s marriage. With humility, he requested to leave for Sarawak in search of peace from his inner turmoil.

Touched by Pengiran Temenggong's sincere plea to leave Brunei for Sarawak, Nasruddin empathised with his emotions and responded with kindness and understanding. The bond between Pengiran Temenggong and Dato Godam, who had acquired knowledge and education from his mother, ultimately led Dato Godam to Brunei. Recognising his intellectual background and ambitions, Nasruddin welcomed him warmly. The sultan highly valued individuals who were knowledgeable, honest, and dedicated to serving their country. Over time, their relationship deepened as Nasruddin came to appreciate Dato Godam's wisdom in governance and his admirable character. Acknowledging his abilities, the sultan increasingly relied on him, especially as Brunei navigated a period of great challenges.

Nasruddin ascended the throne with the backing of influential princes and royal officials, despite his father, Pengiran Muda Besar Abdullah, being the rightful heir. As the eldest son of Jalilul Akbar, Pengiran Muda Besar Abdullah had not inherited the throne due to Jalilul Akbar's decision to pass it to his younger son, Sultan Abdul Jalilul Jabbar. This left Nasruddin initially uncertain about his legitimacy as ruler, as he was not the son of a sultan. According to Brunei’s royal customs, the throne was traditionally reserved for a sultan’s direct descendant. However, through his wisdom and effective leadership, Nasruddin gained the trust and support of the royal family and officials, strengthening his position. Despite opposition from certain princes who believed they were more entitled to rule, he remained committed to his responsibilities. His strong administration, along with his close alliance with Dato Godam, further contributed to the success of his reign.

=== Deepening bond with Dato Godam ===
Nasruddin's administration was hampered by the influence and actions of his princes, which presented difficulties. Based on his experience, Dato Godam offered guidance, proposing to investigate the princes' desires and assign suitable titles and tasks according to their aptitudes. He suggested designating leaders for every village and region ruled by the princes, making sure they were assigned titles and responsibilities that complied with both state regulations and Islamic law. This would guarantee accountability and simplify governance. Dato Godam was highly esteemed by Nasruddin for his true and committed advice as well as his efficient administrative direction. As a result, the sultan began to view him as more than just a foreigner; he became a dependable and devoted counselor who was actively involved in the operations of the state.

Dato Godam was given the opportunity to choose a wife, even if it was one of the sultan's own, by Nasruddin as a token of gratitude for his services. Dato Godam was hesitant to accept the offer because of cultural propriety and a commitment made to Pengiran Temenggong. A woman with a characteristic birthmark on her neck would be eligible for marriage, he had been told. This woman was actually Nasruddin's third wife, but Dato Godam was unaware of this. Dato Godam confirmed it was the same woman he had been told when he saw her at an exhibition and recognised her birthmark. Additionally, he saw the woman sobbing as she gazed at a cannon that was on exhibit. This seemed to arouse intense feelings, either connected to the woman's background or a signal set up by Pengiran Temenggong.

Nasruddin agreed to Dato Godam's request to marry the woman he wished, later revealing she was his third wife. Stunned, Dato Godam sought forgiveness, but the sultan graciously allowed her to go with him. From this marriage, Dato Godam had two sons: Manteri Abdul Rahman (Manteri Uban) and Manteri Said (Manteri Puteh). Eventually, Dato Godam had to return to Minangkabau with Manteri Uban after being called by his father, Bendahara Harun. A search party sent by Bendahara Harun found Dato Godam in Brunei, identifying him through his children. When they presented themselves to Nasruddin and recognised Dato Godam, the sultan and his court were astonished. Upon learning of Dato Godam's true lineage and his role as his father’s successor, the sultan expressed surprise, remarking that if this had not been discovered, Brunei might have been at risk of war.

Although reluctant to let Dato Godam leave, Nasruddin eventually allowed him and his eldest son, Manteri Uban, to return to Minangkabau, as only a direct descendant could replace Bendahara Harun. However, the sultan requested that Dato Godam's second son, Manteri Puteh, remain in Brunei to assist in governing and ensure loyalty to him. In recognition of Dato Godam's contributions, Nasruddin promised that his descendants in Brunei would be granted high status, which led to the establishment of the "Awang-Awang Damit" lineage in Kampong Sungai Kedayan. From this lineage, the Pehin Manteri titles, including Pehin Penyurat and Pehin Bendahari, were introduced for key administrative positions.

Before returning to Minangkabau, Dato Godam stopped in Sarawak to meet his father-in-law, Pengiran Temenggong. However, he fell ill and died in Sapinang, preventing his return. His son, Manteri Uban, chose to remain in Sarawak with his grandmother and later became known as Datu Bandar Abdul Rahman. Meanwhile, Manteri Puteh, who stayed in Brunei, had four sons, whose descendants formed the "Awang-Awang Damit" lineage. Nasruddin was also known as "Sultan Malar Rambang" and was said to have discovered a baby wrapped in kain jongsarat along the Brunei River, whom he raised as his own, forming the "Pempuanan Brunei" lineage.

=== Later life and death ===
During his administration, Nasruddin was challenged by Pengiran Temenggong Pengiran Muda Shamsuddin, who asserted that because of his direct royal ancestry, he was the legitimate sultan. Pengiran Temenggong moved to Gayoh, which is close to Salambigar, and proclaimed himself Pengiran Temenggong Raja di Gayoh in order to establish his authority. Nasruddin, who was well-known for his extraordinary strength and spiritual abilities, saw him as a serious danger and gave Rajid bin Orang Kaya Kasim the order to kill him. In order to deceive Pengiran Temenggong, Rajid poisoned a fruit that was offered to him, which ultimately led to his death. By releasing currency for trade, Nasruddin persisted in bolstering Brunei's economy and trade. The sultanate had stability and prosperity under his rule. He died in 1710 and was laid to rest at Kianggeh Royal Mausoleum, which was renamed "Marhum Kianggeh" after his death.

The exact circumstances of Nasruddin's death remain unclear, but oral tradition suggests that his passing was mysteriously foretold by a boatman reciting a poem about the fall of the kingdom. Upon investigation, it was confirmed that the sultan had indeed died, though the cause was uncertain. Speculation arose that his death might have resulted from a conflict, possibly related to succession disputes or even assassination. Some believed a struggle for the throne led to his demise. The family of Nasruddin's father, Pengiran Muda Besar Abdullah, who resided in Kampong Kiarong, reportedly avoided returning to Brunei due to fears of being killed, indicating tensions and possible unrest during his reign. His grave's uncertainty was due to there being four burial sites in the area.

== See also ==
- List of sultans of Brunei
- Pagaruyung Kingdom

== Notes ==
Regnal titles
Preceded by Muhyiddin	Sultan of Brunei; 1610–1710	Succeeded by Husin Kamaluddin
