= Tanjong Kindana Royal Mausoleum =

Cemetery in Bandar Seri Begawan, Brunei

- Makam Diraja Tanjong Kindana
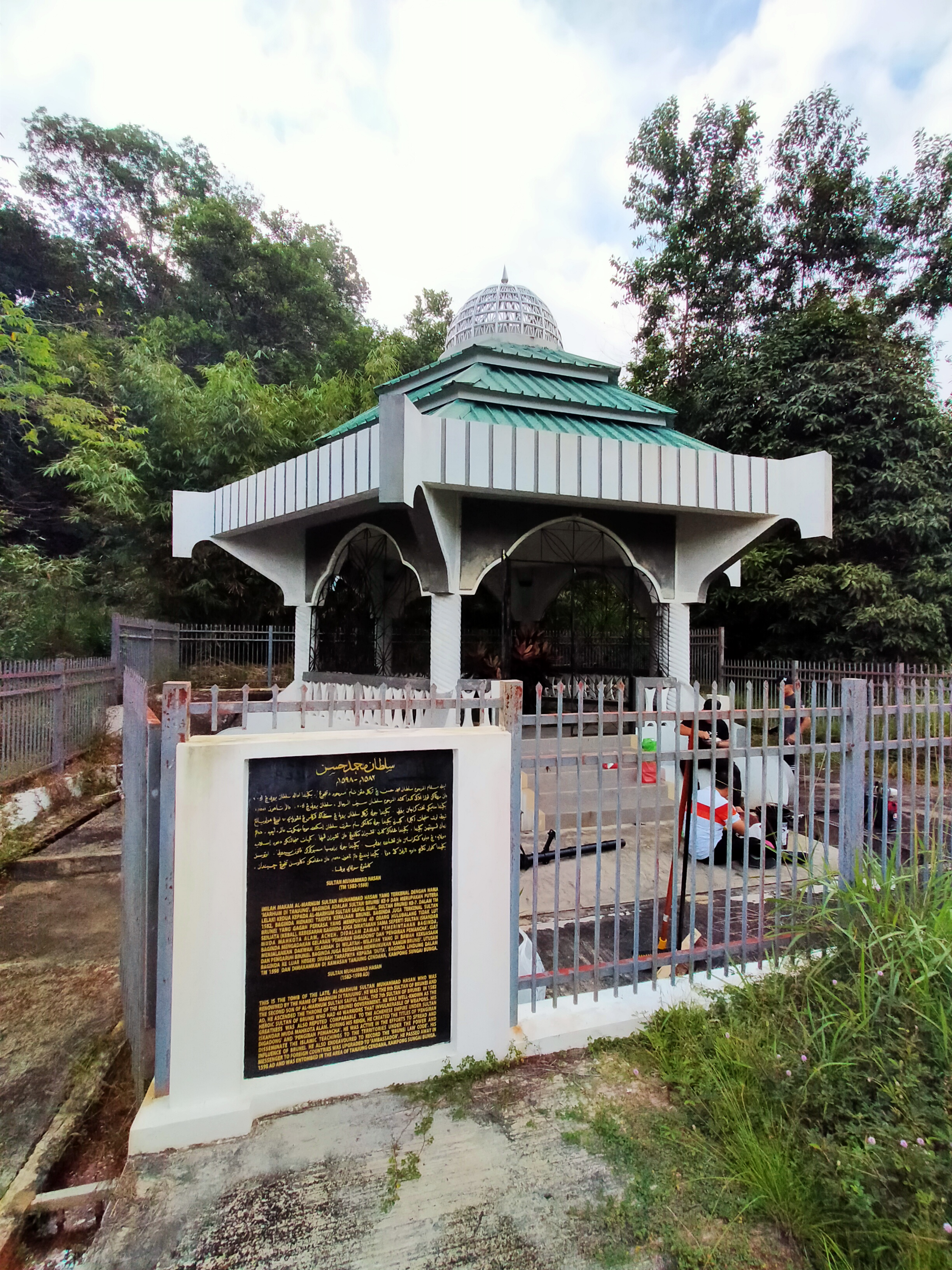
- The Mausoleum in 2023

Details
- Established: before 1598
- Location: Tanjong Kindana, Sungai Bunga, Bandar Seri Begawan
- Country: Brunei
- Coordinates: 4.9147462°N 115.0149069°E
- Type: Royal mausoleum

The Tanjong Kindana Royal Mausoleum (Malay: Makam Diraja Tanjong Kindana) is a Royal Mausoleum located at the former capital of Negara Brunei Darussalam, Tanjong Kindana or also known as Tanjong Chendana. The Mausoleum served as the burial place of Sultan Muhammad Hassan, the 9th Sultan of Brunei who reigned from 1582 until his death in 1598.

== Accessibility ==
The Royal Mausoleum can be reached by boat from Kampong Sungai Besar which is near to Tanjong Kindana.

== List of graves ==
- Sultan Muhammad Hasan (Brunei), 9th Sultan of Brunei (d. 1598).
