= Abdul Jalilul Akbar =

Sultan of Brunei (r. 1598–1659)

Abdul Jalilul Akbar عبد الجليل الأكبر

Sultan of Brunei
- Reign: 1598–1659
- Predecessor: Muhammad Hasan
- Successor: Abdul Jalilul Jabbar
- Born: Abdul Jalilul Akbar ibni Muhammad Hasan; 1573; Brunei
- Died: 1659 (aged 86 yrs); Brunei
- Spouse: Radin Mas Ayu Siti Aishah
- Issue Detail: Sultan Abdul Jalilul Jabbar; Sultan Muhyiddin; Raja Bendahara
Posthumous name
- Marhum Tua (مرحوم توا)
- House: Bolkiah
- Father: Muhammad Hassan
- Religion: Sunni Islam

Abdul Jalilul Akbar ibnu Muhammad Hasan (Jawi: عبد الجليل الأكبر ابن محمد حسن; died 1659), posthumously known as Marhum Tua, was the sultan of Brunei. His verified reign of 61 years, make the longest of any Bruneian sovereign. (Note: Some monarchs of states that were not fully sovereign for most or all of their reign ruled for longer. For example, Sobhuza II of Swaziland at 82 years and Lord Bernard VII of Lippe in the Holy Roman Empire at 81 years.)

According to Jamil Al-Sufri's Tersilah Brunei, he was quoted being a wise ruler and quick to understand antics of his brother, Ibrahim Ali Omar Shah. Through his rule, Brunei saw the strengthening of ties between the Spanish Empire, which was heavily affected by the Castilian War. Moreover, it was only during his reign where the Sultan Hasan's Canons (Syariah Penal Code) were fully implemented and used.

== Reign ==
Abdul Jalilul Akbar the eldest son of Sultan Muhammad Hasan, made him the rightful successor when he took the throne in 1598. His advanced age at the time of his death suggests that he had ruled for a considerable duration or may have been born before his father inherited the kingdom. With no records indicating an interim monarch, it can be inferred that his reign began following his father's death in 1617. After his father's death, Pengiran Muda Besar Abdul Jalilul Akbar was crowned Sultan Abdul Jalilul Akbar. His coronation occurred forty days later, signified by the resumption of the nobat, the ceremonial drum that had been silent during the mourning period. The ceremony was attended by high-ranking officials, including the Pengiran Bendahara, Raja-Raja, Cheteria, Manteri, and other commanders, who gathered to honour the new sultan as he officially assumed his role, which he would hold until his death.

When he ascended to the throne, his uncle Pengiran Di-Gadong Sahibul Mal Besar Oman acted as his regent. Ever since the conflict between several malay sultanates including Brunei and the Spanish Empire, he established and improved ties with the Spaniards at Manila in 1599. Additionally, a peace treaty was signed by both parties and to facilitate trade between Brunei and the Philippines.

It was during his reign when a Dutch trader named Oliver Van Noort visited Brunei from December 1600 to January 1601, followed by a group of English businessmen led by Sir Hendry Middleton as part of his voyage to the East Indies in 1612. Olivier van Noort did not mention the name of the ruling sultan at that time, but managed to describe that the Brunei sultan was under the guardianship of his uncle who acted as his regent. In 1609, the Sarawak Proper revolted and defected to Sambas. The Sultan of Brunei wrote a letter to the Governor-General of the Netherlands East Indies in 1654. Paduka Sri Sultan Ilmu Alam was the name and title's Dutch transliteration. This could refer to Jalilul Alam, a name that appears in the list of titles for legitimate reigns in the Silsilah Raja-Raja Brunei. It was during the Dutchman's visit to Brunei, where the Dutch began establishing trading centers in the island of Borneo.

Sultan Abdul Jalilul Akbar died after ruling the sultanate for 61 years in 1659. After his death, he was posthumously known as Marhum Tua.

== Personal life ==
Sultan Abdul Jalilul Akbar was married three times, with his second wife being Radin Mas Ayu Siti Aishah binti Pengiran (Kiyai) Temenggong Manchu Negoro Gerisik. He had a total of 8 children and those known were:

- Sultan Abdul Jalilul Jabbar, 12th Sultan of Brunei
- Sultan Muhyiddin, 15th Sultan of Brunei
- Besar Abdullah, father of Sultan Nasruddin, 16th Sultan of Brunei
- Raja Bendahara, consort to Abdul Jalil Shah IV

In 1599, Sultan Abdul Jalilul Akbar named his brother, Pengiran Raja Tengah Ibrahim Ali Omar Shah as the first Sultan of Sarawak. Tradition has it that after Sultan Ibrahim Ali Omar Shah died in 1641, no sultan was chosen, and Sarawak was governed by four local datu until the first White Rajah arrived in 1842. He was frequently identified as Sultan Abdul Jalilul Akbar's son or grandchild. But, Sambas' sources provided his son, Radin Sulaiman's exact birthdate, which was 14 April 1601. This made it difficult for Raja Tengah Ibrahim and Sultan Abdul Jalilul Akbar to have a relationship of this kind. The latter did have a son who was known as Raja Tengah, but Sultan Abdul Jalilul Jabbar was the name given to the prince who succeeded him.

== Legacy ==
Five history books, including Sultan Abdul Jalilul Akbar: Marhum Tua, will be released by the Curriculum Development Department (CDD) under the Ministry of Education (MoE) in an effort to help primary school pupils gain a deeper understanding of Brunei's former sultans and queens. The books are anticipated to be released by the end of 2016 and will be provided to all government elementary schools in Brunei, according to Haji Abdul Rahman bin Haji Nawi, director of CDD.

== See also ==
- List of sultans of Brunei

== Notes ==
Regnal titles
Preceded by Muhammad Hasan	Sultan of Brunei; 1598–1659	Succeeded by Abdul Jalilul Jabbar
