= Abdul Hakkul Mubin =

Sultan of Brunei from 1661 to 1673

Abdul Hakkul Mubin عبد الحق المبين

Sultan of Brunei
- Reign: 1661–1673
- Predecessor: Muhammad Ali
- Successor: Muhyiddin
- Born: Brunei
- Died: 1673; Pulau Chermin, Brunei–Muara, Brunei
- Burial: Pulau Chermin Royal Cemetery, Brunei–Muara, Brunei
- Spouse: Pengiran Siti Nur Alam
- Issue Detail: Pengiran Muhammad Alam; Pengiran Muda Amir; Pengiran Abdul Rauf; Pengiran Anak Tengah
Posthumous name
- Al-Marhum di Pulau (المرحوم د ڤولاو)
- House: Bolkiah
- Father: Pengiran Muhammad Panjang
- Mother: Raja Dungu
- Religion: Islam

Abdul Hakkul Mubin ibni Muhammad Panjang (died c. 1673), posthumously known as Al-Marhum di Pulau, was the Sultan of Brunei from 1661 to 1673. He was involved in the Brunei Civil War and ruled the sultanate from 1661 to 1673, after killing his uncle, Sultan Muhammad Ali.

== Reign ==
=== Background ===
Pengiran Muda Bongsu, Sultan Muhammad Ali's own son, was a party to an incident. Pengiran Muhammad Alam, the prince's opponent in the cockfight and the son of Pengiran Bendahara Abdul Hakkul Mubin, was assassinated by Bongsu in revenge after the prince lost. The prince was therefore sentenced to death by his father, the sultan, in accordance with the legal maxim that, as stated in the fifth and eighth clauses on gisas (retribution), death is punishable by death. Pengiran Abdul Hakkul Mubin requested to kill Pengiran Bongsu himself at Sultan Muhammad Ali's palace but was quickly turned down. Sultan Muhammad Ali insisted that only he has the power to punish, thus he refused to allow his son to be put to death. Despite the fact that the Sultan gave him permission to enter the palace to look for the killer prince, who was missing, in the book Mahkota Berdarah. The prince had left the palace by the time he entered. Because of the implied implication, which infuriated Pengiran Abdul Hakkul Mubin, thus causing him to murder everyone inside the palace. Pengiran Abdul Hakkul Mubin then garroted Sultan Muhammad Ali on 16 November 1661, during Asr prayer.

=== Succession ===
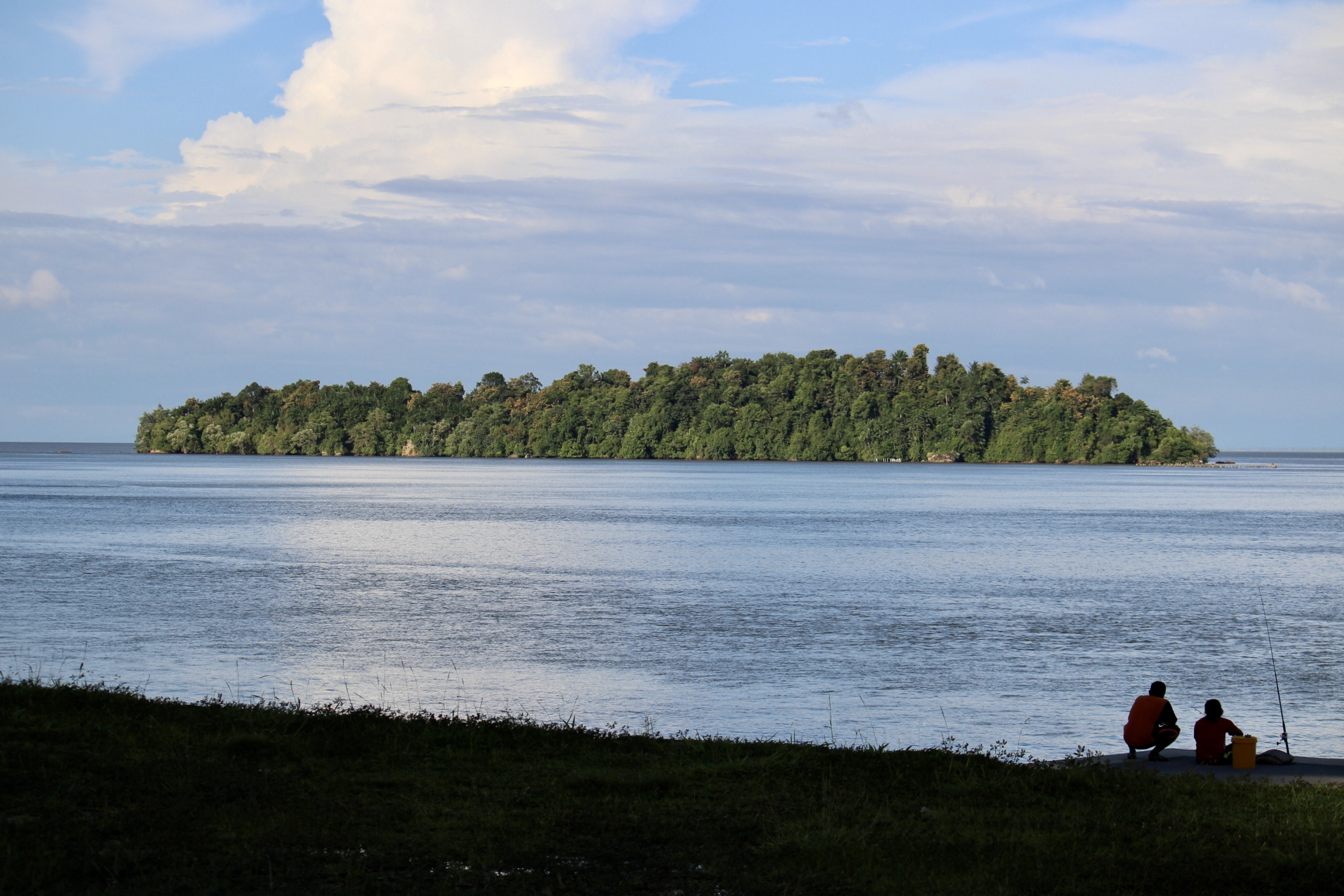
Pulau Chermin, an islet at the mouth of the Brunei River

After Sultan Muhammad Ali was slain by the Bendahara, Brunei was without a Sultan. Due to his close familial ties to the outgoing sultan, Bendahara was chosen as the next sultan to rule the nation. Pengiran Bongsu Muhyiddin, who is none other than the younger brother of Sultan Abdul Jalilul Jabbar from the same mother, received the title of Pengiran Bendahara Seri Maharaja Permaisuara from Sultan Abdul Hakkul Mubin while he was still in power. In order to placate the supporters of the outgoing Sultan, Muhyiddin, Muhammad Ali's nephew and son-in-law, was given the title.

The nation was initially at peace. But, despite the seeming tranquillity, there was still a smoldering resentment of Sultan Hakul Abdul Mubin. In order to overthrow him, several of Sultan Muhammad Ali's supporters pleaded with Bendahara Muhyidin. Bendahara Muhyiddin first believed it to be the wrong course of action. But eventually, he came around and helped arrange the ouster of Sultan Hakkul Abdul Mubin. The first action he and his soldiers took was to cause a commotion for the palace and the nearby homes. By jabbing their spears into the palace and homes, they caused the disruptions. It was simple for the rebels to carry out the attacks because many of them had jobs at the palace.

=== Brunei Civil War ===
In contrast to the Pengiran Bendahara Muhyiddin, Sultan Abdul Hakkul Mubin moved the administrative center from Kota Batu to Pulau Chermin. The relocation was carried out under the direction of the recently appointed Pengiran Bendahara Muhyiddin, with the intention that Abdul Hakkul Mubin would stay put to weather the crisis that existed prior to the Brunei Civil War. After relocating to the island, Muhyiddin established his rule around Kampong Ayer and proclaimed himself the 15th Sultan of Brunei, igniting the nation's first civil war. death. Inquiring as to why Muhyiddin had not set up residence on the island, Sultan Hakkul Abdul Mubin's troops were startled to discover that Muhyiddin had erected the Sultan's yellow flag for himself.

Sultan Hakkul Abdul Mubin constructed a fort 10 miles (16 km) from Kota Kinabalu while he retreated to Kinarut, after he was unable to regain control of Kampong Ayer. He was able to fend off Sultan Muhiyiddin's raids from here with the help of the neighborhood Bajaus and Dusuns, even killing a number of the sultan's cheterias. The fort was carefully positioned on a hill, next to two rivers, with a view of a few small islands in the South China Sea. Legend has it that Sultan Hakkul Abdul Mubin spent roughly ten years in the fort before moving on to become the Sultan of Kinarut, where he, among other people, was able to stop piracy activities in the region.

When Sultan Muhyiddin's forces lost a battle, the conflict moved back into Brunei, and Abdul Hakkul Mubin relocated to Pulau Chermin. Muhyiddin then enlisted the aid of the Sultan of Sulu, asked for more Sulu troops, and negotiated a payment for the eastern Sabah territory. After Sultan Muhyiddin's soldiers arrived on the island, no battles have broken out because Tanjong Kindana's shelling has demolished most defenses, and Sultan Abdul Mubin's execution at the island's Great Mosque has put a stop to the civil war. He had fired most of the regalia into Brunei Bay prior to his execution. At the Pulau Chermin Royal Cemetery, Abdul Hakkul Mubin was laid to rest. There had been no grave discovered on Pulau Chermin, despite them saying Sultan Abdul Hakkul Mubin being buried there.

== Personal life ==
Sultan Abdul Hakkul Mubin was the third son of Duli Yang Teramat Mulia Paduka Seri Pengiran Bendahara Seri Maharaja Pengiran Muhammad Panjang, and his wife, Pengiran Tuah, also known as Raja Dungu, eldest daughter of Sultan Saiful Rijal. He was married to Paduka Sri Raja Istri Pangiran Siti Nur Alam, the eldest daughter of the previous mentioned Sultan, and together they had 4 children, whom were:

- Pengiran Muhammad Alam
- Pengiran Muda Amir
- Pengiran Zamban
- Pengiran Kawat
- Pengiran Abdul Rauf
- Pengiran Anak Tengah

Regnal titles
Preceded by Muhammad Ali	Sultan of Brunei; 1661–1673	Succeeded by Muhyiddin
