= Muwallil Wasit I of Sulu =

Muwallil Wasit I مُوَلِّلْ وَسِتْ ١
- Sultan of Sulu
- Reign: 1610–1650
- Coronation: 1610
- Predecessor: Sultan Batarah Shah Tengah (as Sulu Sultan). The last "Direct descendent" of Sultan Shariful Hashim @ Sayyid Abu Bakar (First Sultan of Sulu). His sister @ Princess Sulu married to Sultan Muhammad Hassan (9th Sultan of Brunei) got Pangiran Shahbandar Maharajalela @ Raja Bongsu @ Sultan Mawalil Wasit I (Sultan of Sulu).
- Successor: Sultan Salah ud-Din Karamat Bakthiar
- Issue: Pangiran Salikula; Pangiran Bakthiar; 2 daughters
Names
- Sultan Mawalil-Wasit-I Pangiran Shahbandar Maharajalela Rajah Bongsu-I. His nowadays heir is HRH. Raja Bongsu II of the Maharajah Adinda Families Royal House.
- Religion: Sunni Islam

Sultan Muwallil Wasit (in his Tausug name) (reigned, 1610–1650), was the 9th Sultan of Sulu and was also known as Rajah Bongsu I. His birth name was Pangiran Shahbandar Maharajalela, and was the youngest son of former Sultan of Brunei Muhammad Hassan. He reigned in Sulu after his uncle, Sultan Batara Shah Tengah died without an heir. He was most likely sent to Sulu to end dynastic troubles there, as he was begot of the marriage of Batara Tengah's Sister, and the Sultan of Brunei. On his coming to Sulu in 1609, he was brought by his father Sultan Muhammad Hassan brought along with his royal symbol's called as "Pulau Janggi" (in Sulu), and "Sepong Janggi" (in Brunei). This royal symbol was a symbol of brotherhood between the Sultanate of Sulu and the Sultanate of Brunei and as a royal proof that Raja Bongsu-I really belonged to the royal family of Brunei.

During his reign, he organised various marriage agreements particularly with Sultan Qudarat who married his daughter in 1632 and even inherited the throne as Sultan Nasir ud-Din. After his death in 1650, another one of his daughters married Rajah Baratamay (also spelled Balatamay) of Buayan in 1657, further strengthening kinship between Sulu and Maguindanao.

Prior to his death in 1650, he was succeeded by Sultan Salah ud-Din Bakthiar who took the throne of the "other" sultan Nasir ud-Din II earlier in 1648.

His descendants are the Kiram, Shakiraullah and Maharajah Adinda families of the later sultans.

== Early life and ascension to the throne ==
The previous Sultan, Batara Shah Tenga was believed to be, even to a nominal extent, a subordinate of Brunei. Although the previous Sultan's reign falls after the year 1578. The year that marks Sulu's de facto independence from Brunei. This however, did not stop the intricately knitted kinship and family ties the Sulu and Brunei Sultanates have with each other, dating as far back as the 14th century. Evidence of this strong family connection is the title of the previous Sultan "Batara", a title used in Brunei annals to refer to rulers of Sulu.

Sultan Tengah's sister was said to have married Sultan Muhammad Hassan of Brunei and Muwallil Wasit-I was begotten from this marriage, as the youngest son. As a prince, he was given the title of Pangiran, and he is said to have lived in Brunei for the most part of his childhood.

In the late 1580s Pangiran Bongsu, as he was then called was sent to Bauang, the then, capital of Sulu to aid the Sulus militarily against the Spaniards who were once again attacking them. In 1610, Sultan Tengah died with no male heir to the throne, as he was a nephew of the previous Sultan, he was named successor. He took the name Sultan Muwallil Wasit-I, a Tausug name to attract a following of the Tausug nobles. He is also believed to have brought with him a Bruneian aide-de-camp, only known as "Datu Acheh".

== Reign ==
=== Early Reign ===
Datu Acheh and Sultan Wasit were believed to have united many Datus and Panglimas or tribal leaders into regions and areas that could be governed by representatives of the Sultanate. This, in turn would lead to a more unified and cohesive government to rule the otherwise, independent and interdependent Datus of the Sulu area. His early reign was marked by immense successes in trade and strengthening of ties with other tribes within the area.

=== War with Spain ===
The first incidences of hostility between Wasit and the Spaniards in Manila occurred in 1627, when his Bruneian aide, Datu Acheh on official business in Manila for the Sultanate, was intercepted by Manila Spaniards on his way home. Datu Acheh managed to escape but the act of treachery in the face of a diplomatic mission, perpetrated by the Spaniards incited anger among the Tausugs, and Sultan Wasit was quick to respond.

Gathering a force of 2,000 Tausug warriors, he ordered a massive attack on the shipyards of Camarines. The raid on the shipyards led to a fierce retaliation from the Spaniards. A year later, they returned the attack by organising a raiding force of 200 Spanish officers and 1,600 Christian Filipinos. However, this attack saw no clear victor, but Bauang, or Jolo, as the Spaniards called it, the seat of Sultan Wasit and his court, for the most part, survived the attack, and in 1629, readily sent another expedition, under the command of Datu Acheh to attack Spanish settlements in Camarines, Samar, Leyte and Bohol. This is the last mention of Datu Acheh in Sulu and Spanish historical records. The Spaniards retaliated again with a punitive expedition led by Commander Lorenzo de Olaso, on 17 March 1630. Upon landing on the shores of Jolo to attack it, de Olaso was badly wounded and the Spaniards lost heart and retreated, resulting in a decisive Sulu victory.

The Sultan and his warriors launched still another invasion, this time, targeted only on the Island of Leyte, what they saw as the seat of Spanish power in the Visayas.

He later organised a marriage agreement, with the famed Sultan Kudarat, who was at this time, also waging a successful but bloody war with Spain. In 1632, Qudarat married one of his daughters, and called for a Two-Sultanate alliance, to consolidate his gains, and increase his prestige, one that was never before seen among the Sulu Sultans since the Sultanate's founding almost 2 and a half centuries earlier.

In 1634, The Two-Sultanate-Alliance mobilised a 1,500-warrior-contingent and attacked Spanish-controlled settlements in Dapitan, Leyte and Bohol. Slave raiding had escalated and it began benefiting the Sulu economy immensely. Sultan Wasit grew in wealth and prestige, as well as in fame, particularly among his Spanish rivals, who knew him by the name "Rajah Bongsu". The 1634 attack on the Visayan islands of Leyte and Bohol were a subject of particular celebration, as various captives, including a Spanish priest named Fray Juan Batista Vilancio were taken to Jolo as captives. the following year, in January, the said priest was said to have escaped and travelled back to Manila to inform the Spanish government there of yet another possible attack by the 2 Sultanates, with reports of a fleet assembling at what is now Zamboanga City. Don Juan Cerezo Salamanca, then Governor-general of the colony ordered an expedition be sent out at once, to curb the piratical raids in the region, and to establish a foothold in the area.

On 6 April 1635, Spanish captain Juan de Chaves was ordered to beachhead the south and established a military garrison in Samboangan, he named Bagumbayan, and became the forerunner of Ciudad de Zamboanga; This garrison in Samboangan led to the beginning of the defeat of Kudarat’s feared admiral, Datu Tagal, who had raided several pueblos in the Visayas. On 23 June 1635, Governor Salamanca next ordered a Jesuit-engineer-priest Melchor de Vera to lay a cornerstone for the construction of Real Fuerza de San Jose in Bagumbayan (present-day Fort Pilar). This Fort would continue to be the bane of the Southern Moros for centuries to come. Another success of this Spanish expedition was the return of a certain "Coat of Arms" of the Royal Sultanate of Sulu. Believed to be a flag captured during the campaign, the object, along with other spoils of war were brought to Manila as trophies.

This sudden attack on the Moro fleets did not at all, deter the Sultans Kudarat and Wasit from continuing their piratical activities. It seemed, that it would only serve as a delay. For in 1636, Datu Tagal, admiral of Sultan Kudarat sent a massive fleet of "over 100 proas" with sailors and mainers gathered from all over Mindanao, Sulu and Borneo. The raiding fleet ravaged the coasts of the Visayas and looted most of the major settlements there.

=== Arrival of General Corcuera ===
The great victory of Kudarat and Tagal in the Visayas was celebrated throughout the Two Sultanates. It appears, however that Sulu involvement became rather limited at this point. Other than contributing a regular contingency of Tausug warriors, Sultan Wasit began work on administration once again. before making war with the Spaniards, he first settled disputes and conflict in his own domain. This marked his rule as one of great prosperity and victory in the hearts of the Sulu people. However, the short interlude between the last major Sulu-led Naval campaign in the late 1620s and the current, administrative phase of the Sultan was about to end.

Later that year, in 1636, The new Governor-general Sebastian Hurtado de Corcuera personally led an expedition against Kudarat and Tagal and triumphed over his forces at Lamitan and Lian. This decisive victory did not mark the end of Kudarat's career, the defiant Sultan continued to resist and incite resistance among his followers, and him and Corcuera were to become arch-rivals.

The attacks on Kudarat's raiding bases and the strengthening of Spanish bases in Samboangan was quickly noted by Sultan Wasit, who quickly ordered the fortification of Jolo, reapiring his Kuta or fort and calling on allies from Borneo and Makassar. In 1638, the awaited attack by General Corcuera came and The initial force of over 2,000 combined Spanish and Filipino troops were repelled, and kept at bay for at least 3 months by his 4,000-strong force. However, disease took over, and many defenders were killedm allowing the Spaniards a massive advantage.

Sultan Wasit and his court were forced to flee Jolo for a new settlement in Dungun, Tawi-Tawi. The southernmost islands of his kingdom. for 8 long years, He and His son, Pangiran Sarikula (Sometimes spelled Salikula) along with the Datus of Sulu fought the Spaniards and reduced the garrison at Jolo. With Dutch aid, Pangiran Sarikula raided and heavily damaged the fort in 1644. Eventually, Sultan Qudarat, under the name Sultan Nasir ud-Din, accepted a Sulu-Spanish treaty that officially ended hostilities in Jolo, for now. The treaty, dated 14 April 1646 recognised Sulu's boundaries and territories, as independent from Spain, and the treaty also gave Sulu a stronger economic presence in the region. Sultan Wasit himself, was unable to return to Jolo personally, due to old age.

== Final Years and Death ==
Starting in the 1640s Sulu's main army was put under the command of his eldest son, and heir to the throne, Pangiran Salikula. And for about 4 and a half years, was the de facto Sultan of Sulu, due to his father's old age. Sultan Nasir ud-Din or Qudarat, assumed the throne in 1645, by virtue of his marriage with Wasit's daughter. He was crowned in Jolo, while Sultan Wasit-I remained in Dungun, Tawi-Tawi. In late 1650, Sultan Nasir ud-Din was asked to step down from the throne, after Sarikula had died prematurely, Sultan Muwallil Wasit-I assumed the throne once more. But his resumption of power was to be short-lived. He died in Tawi-Tawi, to be succeeded by his other son, Pangiran Bakhtiar.

Royal titles
Preceded by Sultan Batara Shah Tengah (in other location)	Sultan of Sulu; 1610–1650	Succeeded by Sultan Salah ud-Din Bakthiar
