= Muhammad Ali of Brunei =

Sultan of Brunei (r. 1660–1661)

Muhammad Ali محمد علي

Sultan of Brunei
- Reign: 1660–1661
- Installation: 1660
- Predecessor: Abdul Jalilul Jabbar
- Successor: Abdul Hakkul Mubin
- Died: 16 November 1661
- Issue Detail: Sultan Hussin Kamaluddin
Posthumous name
- Marhum Tumbang di Rumput (مرحوم تومبڠ د رومڤوت)
- House: Bolkiah
- Father: Muhammad Hasan
- Religion: Sunni Islam

Haji Muhammad Ali ibni Muhammad Hasan (died 16 November 1661), also known as Marhum Tumbang di Rumput, was the 13th Sultan of Brunei. His murder would later go on to spark the beginning of the Brunei Civil War between his killer and Sultan Muhyiddin, which a protracted civil war of succession that broke out and lasted for several years.

== Reign (1660-1661) ==
=== Disagreement ===
Prior to him ascending to the throne in 1660, he was known as Raja Muhammad Ali. During Sultan Muhammad Ali's reign, the Brunei Legal Code was also put into effect. The sultan's own son, Pengiran Muda Bongsu, was involved in an incident. The son of Pengiran Bendahara Abdul Hakkul Mubin, Pengiran Muhammad Alam was the prince's opponent in the cockfight, and out of retaliation after losing, Bongsu killed him in revenge. As a result, the prince was given a death sentence by his father, the sultan, in accordance with the legal principle that death is punishable by death, as stated in the fifth and eighth clauses on qisas (retribution).

=== Murder ===
Pengiran Abdul Hakkul Mubin came to Sultan Muhammad Ali's palace and requested if he could carry out the killing of Pengiran Bongsu himself, but was soon rejected. He refused to permit the execution of his son, arguing that he alone has the authority to punish. Pengiran Abdul Hakkul Mubin was enraged at the meaning that was left unsaid and killed everyone inside the palace. Sultan Muhammad Ali was then garroted by Pengiran Abdul Hakkul Mubin during Asr prayer on 16 November 1661. His death led Abdul Hakkul Mubin in succeeding him as Sultan of Brunei and also sparking the Brunei Civil War. After his demise, he was locally known as Marhum Tumbang di Rumput.

=== Aftermath ===
He was avenged by his son-in-law Muhyiddin who later became the fourteenth Sultan of Brunei. Sultan Muhyiddin wanted to pass the throne back to Sultan Muhammad Ali's family when he was in power. Sultan Muhyiddin's planned successor, Pengiran Muda Bongsu, who had fled to Sambas, was asked to return to Brunei and granted the title of Raja Bendahara. Despite that, Pengiran Muda Bongsu died prior to that purpose could be carried out. In the end, Pengiran Anak Muhammad Alam, son of Pengiran Muda Pengiran Muda Bongsu, was chosen by Sultan Muhyiddin to serve as Raja Bendahara Alam.

== Personal life ==
Sultan Muhammad Ali had 4 children, whom were:

- Raja Omar Pumukar
- Sultan Hussin Kamaluddin, 17th Sultan of Brunei
- Pangiran Muda Bongsu Besar Hassan
- Pangiran Anak Putri Siti Mariam, consort to Sultan Muhyiddin

== See also ==
- List of sultans of Brunei
- Brunei Civil War

Regnal titles
Preceded by Abdul Jalilul Jabbar	Sultan of Brunei; 1660–1661	Succeeded by Abdul Hakkul Mubin
