= Muhyiddin of Brunei =

Sultan of Brunei (r. 1673–1690)

Muhyiddin محيي الدين

Sultan of Brunei
- Reign: 1673–1690
- Predecessor: Abdul Hakkul Mubin
- Successor: Nasruddin
- Born: 1643; Kampong Ayer or Kota Batu, Brunei
- Died: 1690 (aged 46–47); Brunei
- Spouse: Pangiran Anak Putri Siti Maria
- Issue Detail: Prince Shah Mubin; Pengiran Anak Kasim
Names
- Muhyiddin ibni Abdul Jalilul Akbar
Regnal name
- Sultan Muhyiddin ibni Al-Marhum Sultan Abdul Jalilul Akbar
- House: Bolkiah
- Father: Abdul Jalilul Akbar
- Mother: Radin Mas Ayu Siti Aisha
- Religion: Sunni Islam

Muhyiddin ibni Abdul Jalilul Akbar (Jawi: محيي الدين ابن عبد الجليل الأكبر; reign 1673–1690) was the 15th sultan of Brunei and the fourth son of Sultan Abdul Jalilul Akbar. He took the throne after defeating Sultan Abdul Hakkul Mubin during the Bruneian Civil War of 1660. Notably, he also attempted to return the throne back to the origin bloodline via Sultan Muhammad Ali's family.

== Reign (1673-1690) ==
=== Background ===
Following the murder of his father-in-law, Sultan Muhammad Ali, Pengiran Bongsu Muhyiddin obtained the title of Pengiran Bendahara Seri Maharaja Permaisuara from Sultan Abdul Hakkul Mubin while he was still in power. Muhyiddin was the younger brother of Sultan Abdul Jalilul Jabbar, with the same mother. Muhyiddin, Sultan Muhammad Ali's nephew and son-in-law, was given the title in order to appease the supporters of the assassinated sultan.

=== Rebellion ===
At first, there was calm throughout the sultanate, but there was still smoldering resentment of Sultan Hakul Abdul Mubin. In order to overthrow him, several of Sultan Muhammad Ali's supporters pleaded with Muhyiddin. He initially declined, but eventually he came around and helped arrange the ouster the current sultan. The first action he and his soldiers took was to jab their spears into the palace and nearby homes. It was simple for the rebels to carry out the attacks because many of them had jobs at the palace.

=== Bruneian Civil War ===
Sultan Abdul Hakkul Mubin relocated the administrative center from Kota Batu to Pulau Cermin, in contrast to Muhyiddin. With the goal that Abdul Hakkul Mubin would remain put to weather the crisis that occurred prior to the Brunei Civil War, the relocation was carried out under the direction of the recently appointed Pengiran Bendahara Muhyiddin.

Muhyiddin established his reign in Kampong Ayer after moving to the island and declared himself the 15th sultan of Brunei, starting the country's first civil war. Sultan Hakkul Abdul Mubin were puzzled as to why he had not made the island his home, so his warriors were shocked to learn that he had raised the yellow flag of the sultan for himself.

Several of Sultan Muhyiddin's Cheterias were killed when their attack on Sultan Abdul Hakkul Mubin's fort in Kinarut was repelled with the help of Bajaus and Dusuns. Muhyddin's soldiers failed to overthrow Sultan Hakkul Abdul Mubin in their final assault at Kinarut, prompting Sultan Abdul Hakkul Mubin to return to Pulau Cermin. Aid from the Sultan of Sulu was requested by Muhyiddin in exchange for the province of eastern Sabah. Sultan Muhyiddin was concerned that the conflict would stretch on and on. Before making a last attack on the island, Muhyiddin's soldiers bombarded Pulau Cermin from Tanjung Kindana. No fighting had taken place since Sultan Muhyiddin's men landed on the island as the bombardment destroyed the majority of the defenses, and Sultan Abdul Hakkul Mubin's execution at the island's Great Mosque ended the civil war.

The Brunei History Centre of the Ministry of Culture, Youth and Sports hosted a session with an emphasis on the study of ancient Borneo manuscripts. A total of 53 papers were featured, with participation from both inside and outside the nation. Of particular note were the 37 presentations from the Borneo Islands, Indonesia, and Malaysia from 27 to 28 November 2017. A particular letter from Sultan Muhyiuddin was looked into, in which he wrote to an English captain, who oversaw the English trade in Jambi, for delivery to the Sultan of Jambi, the Pengiran Adipati, who may be Prince Dipati Anum, who ruled from 1630 to 1661, while Muhyiuddin ruled from 1673 to 1690. This indicates that Jambi was the destination of the troops when the Brunei civil war ended. Sultan Muhyiddin was able to beat Sultan Hakkul Mubin on Pulau Cermin because to the purchase of gunpowder.

=== Aftermath ===
Sultan Muhyiddin wanted to return the throne to Sultan Muhammad Ali's family when he was in power. His original successor, Pengiran Muda Bongsu, who had fled to Sambas amid the outbreak of the civil war, was asked to return to Brunei and granted the title of Raja Bendahara. But Pengiran Muda Bongsu passed away before that could be carried out. In the end, Pengiran Anak Muhammad Alam, son of Pengiran Muda Bongsu, was chosen by Sultan Muhyiddin to serve as Raja Bendahara. Sultan Muhyiddin traveled to Kampong Kelaka of Kuala Klawang after the appointment and stayed there. The name of Raja Bendahara is not listed in the Salasilah Raja-raja Brunei, despite being appointed by him. Muhyiddin, who had lived in Kelaka, was requested to take over as ruler of the Sultanate of Brunei after Pengiran Anak Muhammad Alam's death, at last attaining the throne.

== Death ==
Sultan Muhyiddin died in 1690 and was succeeded by Pengiran Anak Chucu Nasruddin ibnu Pengiran Muda Besar Abdullah, titled Sultan Nasruddin.

== Personal life ==
Sultan Muhyiddin was married to Pangiran Anak Putri Siti Maria, daughter of Sultan Muhammad Ali. They had two children:

- Pengiran Muda Shah Mubbin
- Pengiran Anak Kasim

== See also ==
- List of sultans of Brunei

Regnal titles
Preceded by Abdul Hakkul Mubin	Sultan of Brunei; 1673–1690	Succeeded by Nasruddin
