= Abdul Jalilul Jabbar =

Sultan of Brunei (r. 1659–1660)

Abdul Jalilul Jabbar عبد الجليل الجبار

Sultan of Brunei
- Reign: 1659–1660
- Predecessor: Abdul Jalilul Akbar
- Successor: Muhammad Ali
- Born: Raja Tengah Aliuddin
- Died: 1660
- Issue Detail: Prince Ahmad; Prince Muhammad Shamsuddin
- Father: Abdul Jalilul Akbar
- Mother: Radin Mas Ayu Siti Aishah
- Religion: Sunni Islam

Abdul Jalilul Jabbar ibni Abdul Jalilul Akbar (Jawi: عبد الجليل الجبار ابن عبد الجليل الأكبر; died 1660) was the sultan of Brunei from 1659 to 1660. He was renowned for his justice, harmony, and peace before the breakout of the Brunei Civil War in the late 17th century, which caused the territories of Brunei to fragment in many places.

== Reign ==
=== Succession ===
Prior to his succession to the throne, he was known as Raja Tengah Aliuddin. After Sultan Abdul Jalilul Akbar's death, there was a civil war and disputed succession between Raja Besar Pangiran Abdul (Abdullah), the eldest son, who may have reigned briefly but was not recognized in the Sisilah, and Raja Tengah Aliuddin, the second son. The latter overthrew the former and assumed the title of Sultan Abdul Jalilul Jabbar. Although the Sisilah does not prove dates for these events, the history of Sulu at this period does.

Sultan Muwallil Wasit I consented to attend talks with Sebastián Hurtado de Corcuera, the Spanish Commander-in-Chief, in Zamboanga in 1637, before the decisive battle between the Spanish and the Sulu. This shows that Sultan Muwalil Wasit supported his senior nephew, Raja Besar, by interfering in the civil war in Brunei. He would go on to order the assassination of Raja Besar Pangiran Abdul, which was successfully carried out at Madang-Madang, Labuan. It was suggested by Sultan Abdul Jalilul Jabbar that Sultan Muwalil Wasit's Sulu was not worth attacking. Yet, the Sultan of Sulu could not have liked the new sultan, who had threatened to attack him while the Spanish were harassing him.

=== Testament ===
The Sultan Hasan's Canons (Syariah Penal Code) was left intact by his father in his testament for him.

== Death ==
Sultan Abdul Jalilul Jabbar ruled only for a year from 1659 to 1660, before dying and was succeeded by his uncle Muhammad Ali, despite having two children:

- Raja Muda Ahmad
- Pangiran Muda Muhammad Shamsuddin

== See also ==
- List of sultans of Brunei

Regnal titles
Preceded by Abdul Jalilul Akbar	Sultan of Brunei; 1659–1660	Succeeded by Muhammad Ali
