= Bruneian Civil War of 1660 =

Civil war fought in Brunei (1661–1673)

Bruneian Civil War
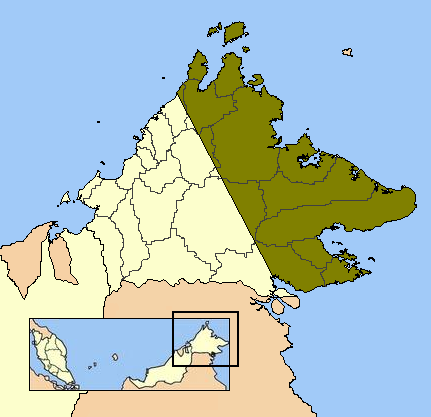
- The Sulu Sultanate claimed that the eastern part of Sabah was reportedly given by Brunei as reward for helping Sultan Muhyiddin's forces.
Date	1661–1673
Location	North Borneo (Sabah and Sarawak; present-day of Malaysia and Brunei)
Result	Victory for Muhyiddin's faction
Territorial changes	Eastern part of Sabah was given to Sulu Sultanate as reward for helping Muhyiddin's forces (Sulu claim narrative; disputed)

Belligerents
Abdul Hakkul Mubin's forces	Muhyiddin's forces; Rebels from Sultan Muhammad Ali's followers; Kedayan and Bajau Tribes; Sultanate of Sulu; Supported by: Jambi Sultanate

Commanders and leaders
Abdul Hakkul Mubin †	Muhyiddin; Pengiran Adipati; Sultan Salahud-Din Bakhtiar

Strength
Unknown	Unknown soldiers Gunpowder from Jambi

The Bruneian Civil War (Malay: Perang Saudara Brunei and in Tagalog: Digmaang Sibil sa Brunay) was a civil war in the Bruneian Sultanate from 1661 to 1673 between Abdul Hakkul Mubin and Muhyiddin. During Sultan Muhammad Ali's reign, a dispute led to the killing of Pengiran Muda Alam by Pengiran Muda Bongsu. In retaliation, Abdul Hakkul Mubin killed Muhammad Ali and declared himself the fourteenth sultan. A civil war ensued, with Abdul Hakkul Mubin fleeing to Kinarut. Sultan Muhyiddin sought help from the Sultan of Sulu, promising the area of Kimanis as a reward. The dispute over eastern Sabah remains a legacy of this civil war.

== Causes ==
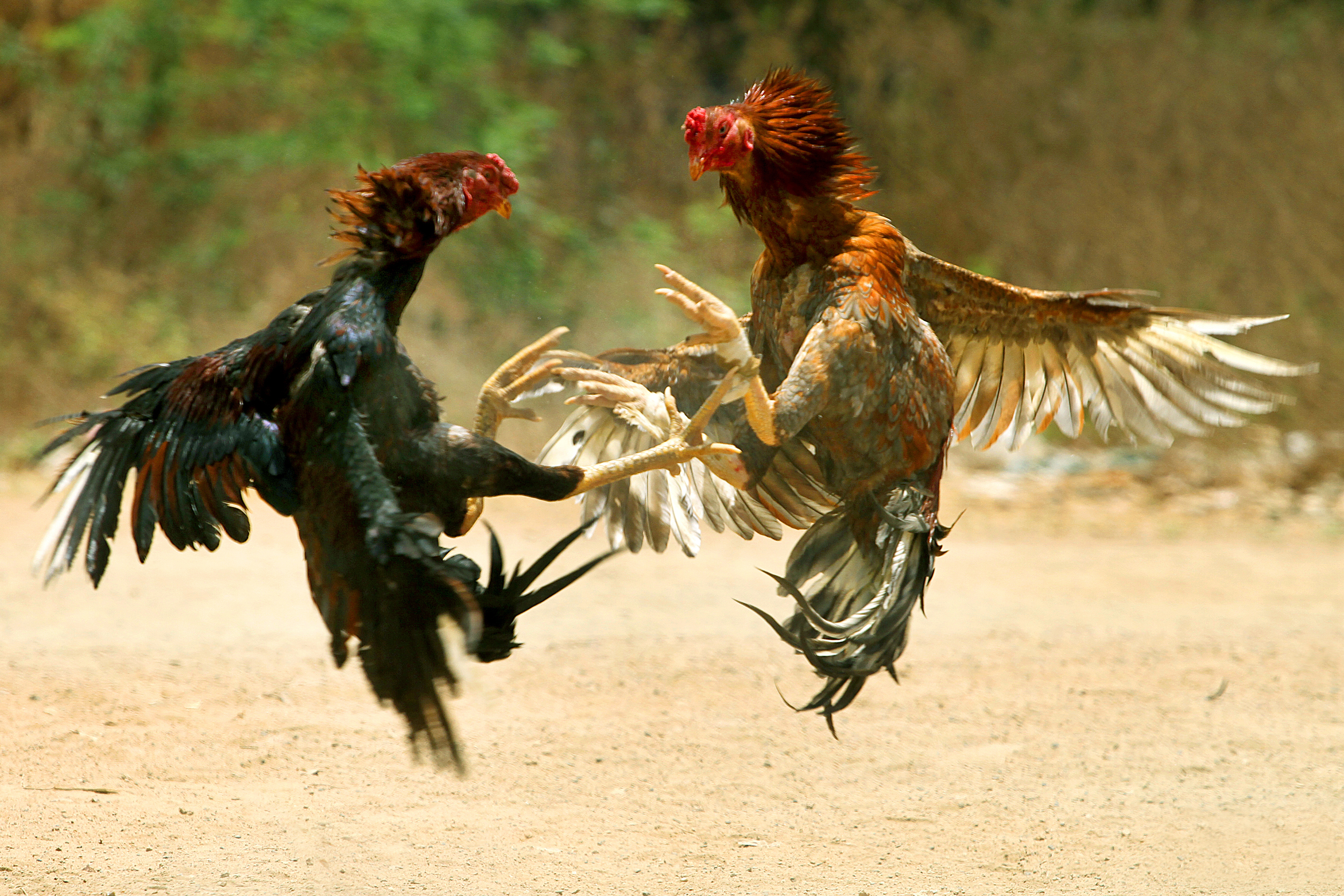
The Brunei Civil War was triggered by a cockfight

During the reign of the thirteenth Sultan Muhammad Ali, there was a disagreement between the son of the Sultan, Pengiran Muda ("prince") Bongsu and Pengiran Muda Alam, the son of Pengiran Abdul Mubin over the results of a cockfight which Pengiran Muda Bongsu lost. His defeat was jeered by Pengiran Muda Alam. In his rage, Bongsu killed Pengiran Muda Alam and escaped from the scene.

In revenge, Abdul Hakkul Mubin and his followers garroted Sultan Muhammad Ali. Abdul Hakkul Mubin then made himself the fourteenth Sultan and took the title of "Sultan Abdul Hakkul Mubin". He tried to appease the previous Sultan's followers by appointing Muhammad Ali's grandson, Muhyiddin as the new Bendahara ("Chief Minister"). After a while, however, Muhammad Ali's supporters took revenge by convincing Bendahara Muhyiddin to stand up against Abdul Hakkul Mubin. Bendahara Muhyddin initially refused, but then later agreed to do so. His supporters started making disturbances in the form of poking spears into palaces and homes.

Sultan Abdul Hakkul Mubin then moved his palace to Chermin Island under the advice of Muhyiddin with the intent to wait the crisis out. After he left, however, Muhyiddin declared himself the fifteenth sultan. A battle between the two competing Sultans then ensued. Thus, the civil war of Brunei started.

== War ==
During the civil war, Abdul Hakkul Mubin fled to Kinarut (in present-day Papar, Sabah, Malaysia) where, he stayed there for ten years, repelling repeated attacks by Sultan Muhyiddin. They returned to Brunei after a final attack by Muhyiddin's forces in which they failed to defeat Abdul Hakkul Mubin. It also noted that Muhyiddin finally defeated Abdul Hakkul Mubin in Chermin Island, using gunpowder they had purchased. This gunpowder originated from the Jambi Sultanate.

=== Sulu claim narrative ===
Muhyiddin eventually emerged victorious in the civil war and Abdul Hakkul Mubin was killed and later buried at the royal burial ground on the island. It is not clear to historians whether Muhyiddin asked for Sulu’s help in the civil war. The Sultan of Sulu, however, claimed that he was asked by Brunei to help and was promised eastern Sabah as a reward. The Sultan of Sulu claimed eastern Sabah as a gift from the Sultan of Brunei, for Tausug assistance during the civil war (an event which traced the roots of the North Borneo dispute between Malaysia and the Philippines in the present-day).

== See also ==
- Sultanate of Sulu
- History of Sabah
- Sultan of Brunei
