= List of bridges in Brunei =

== Historical and architectural interest bridges ==
Image	#	Name	Span	Length	Structural type	Carries Crosses	Opened	Location	District	Ref.
	1	Residency Bridge	–	–	Arch	Road bridge Kianggeh River	1900	Bandar Seri Begawan; 4.8871100°N 114.9447553°E	Brunei–Muara	
	2	Clifford Bridge	–	360 ft (110 m)	Beam	Road bridge Kedayan River	1929	Bandar Seri Begawan; 4.8932348°N 114.9352027°E	Brunei–Muara	
	3	Berry Bridge	–	100 ft (30 m)	Truss	Road bridge Seria River	1940	Panaga; 4.5983797°N 114.2785621°E	Belait	
	4	Old Sungai Tutong Bridge	–	600 ft (180 m)	Arch	Road bridge Tutong River	1950	Serambangun–Sengkarai; 4.7958957°N 114.6473138°E	Tutong	
	5	Edinburgh Bridge	–	–	Arch	Road bridge Kedayan River	1959	Bandar Seri Begawan; 4.893261°N 114.935242°E	Brunei–Muara	
	6	Bangar Bridge	–	300 ft (91 m)	Beam	Road bridge Temburong River	1969	Bangar; 4.7072750°N 115.0733787°E	Brunei–Muara	

== Major bridges ==
This table presents a non-exhaustive list of the road and railway bridges with spans greater than 100 metres (328 ft).

Image	#	Name	Span	Length	Structural type	Carries Crosses	Opened	Location	District	Ref.
	1	Raja Isteri Pengiran Anak Hajah Saleha Bridge	300 m (980 ft)	622 m (2,041 ft)	Cable-stayed; Concrete box girder deck, concrete pylon 30+87+300+160+45	Road bridge Brunei River	2017	Bandar Seri Begawan; 4°52′36.0″N 114°56′55.7″E	Brunei-Muara	
	2	Temburong Bridge; Eastern Channel Bridge	260 m (850 ft)	26,200 m (86,000 ft)	Cable-stayed; Concrete beam deck, concrete pylons 130+260+130	Road bridge Brunei Bay	2020	Kampong Mentiri–Labu Estate; 4°53′10.0″N 115°05′00.9″E	Brunei-Muara; Temburong	
	3	Temburong Bridge; Brunei Channel Bridge	145 m (476 ft)(x2)	26,200 m (86,000 ft)	Cable-stayed; Concrete beam deck, concrete pylon 145+145	Road bridge Brunei River	2020	Kampong Mentiri–Labu Estate; 4°55′30.2″N 115°00′59.0″E	Brunei-Muara; Temburong	
	4	Pulau Muara Besar Bridge	120 m (390 ft)(x2)	2,680 m (8,790 ft)	Box girder Prestressed concrete 80+120+120+80	Road bridge Brunei Bay	2018	Kampong Serasa–Muara Besar Island; 5°00′17.4″N 115°04′15.3″E	Brunei-Muara	

== See also ==
- Transport in Brunei
- Rail transport in Brunei
- Geography of Brunei
- List of rivers of Brunei
