= Bendahara Sakam =

Bruneian nobility

Bendahara Sakam بندهار ساكم
- Pengiran Bendahara
- Born: Raja Sakam
- Burial: Tarap Besar Islamic Cemetery, Bandar Seri Begawan, Brunei
- Sakam ibni Abdul Kahar Jalilul Alam
Regnal name
- Pengiran Bendahara Sakam ibni Sultan Abdul Kahar Jalilul Alam
- House: Bolkiah
- Father: Sultan Abdul Kahar
- Mother: Raja Bajau
- Religion: Sunni Islam

Raja Sakam (Jawi: راج ساکم) or commonly referred to by his title Bendahara Sakam (بندهار ساکم), was the son of the Sultan Abdul Kahar by his Sabah wife, Raja Bajau. He is a peculiar folk hero in certain respects. His name was consistently spelled Bendahara Saqkam in the manuscript, Silsilah raja-raja Brunei.

== Early life ==
Raja Sakam was the descended of prominent lineages, including Datu Lakandula, Raja Sulaiman, and Raja Matanda of Luzon.

Pengiram Seri Ratna's daughter is said to have boldly abducted by him from her marriage to Pengiran Seri Lela's son, and brought her to his home. Sultan Saiful Rijal consented to punishing him when the enraged pengirans brought the issue before him. Despite being banished and humiliated, he returned back to Brunei to help his brother, Sultan Saiful Rijal's government. Raja Sakam's licentious nature was noted to be likely the cause of this reign's problems.

== Castilian War ==
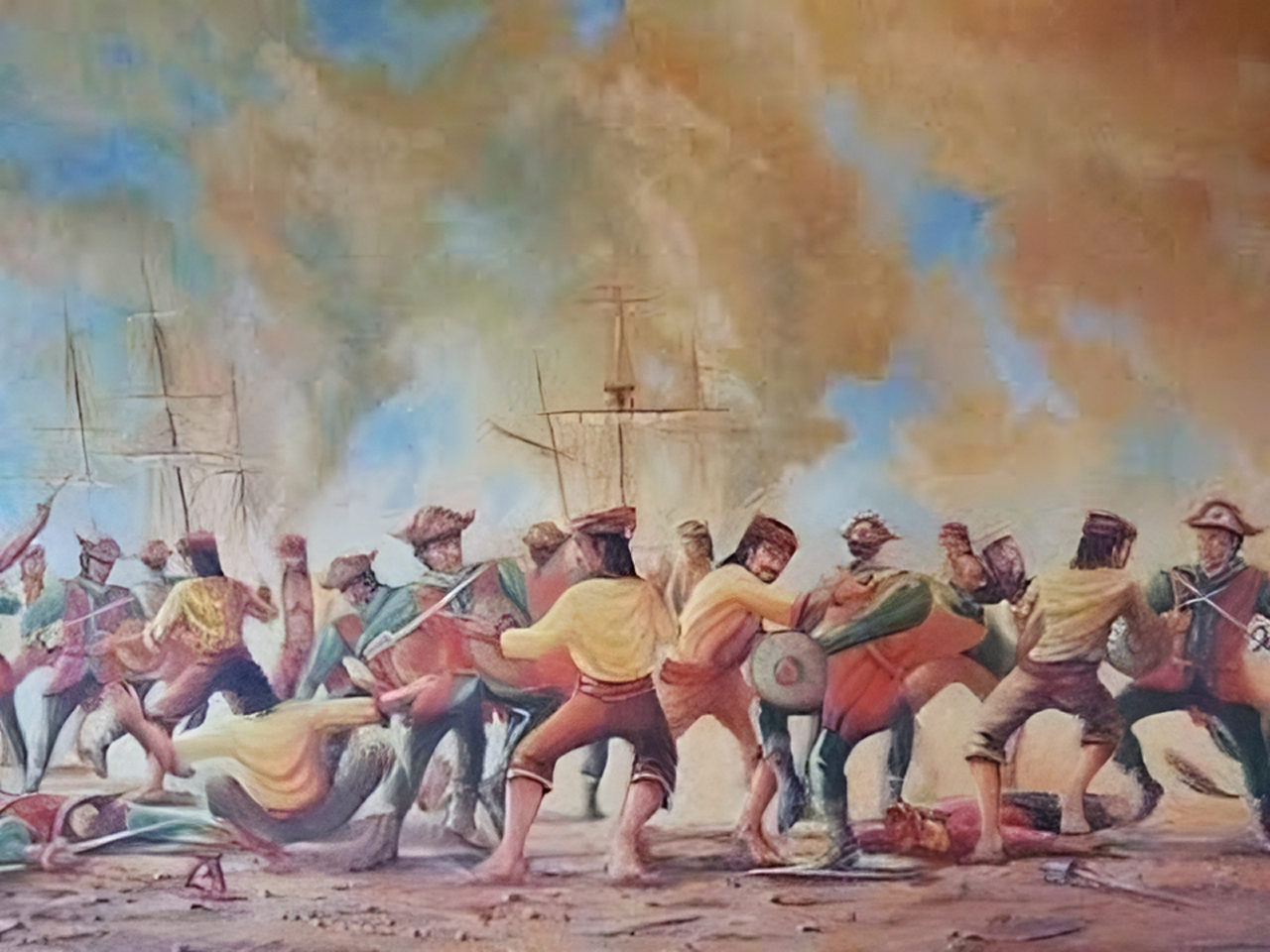
The Spanish forces fighting against the Bruneian forces

Bendahara Sakam's historical significance extends to his involvement in repelling the Spanish attack on Brunei during the Castilian War of 1578, in collaboration with Orang Kaya Tiger Padang and a contingent of 1,000 warriors. He was given command of Brunei's army to subjugate the territory lying between Sabah and Luzon. This event marked a critical juncture in Brunei's history, as it faced external threats from European colonial powers. His leadership, strategic acumen, and his collaborative defense effort demonstrated his dedication to safeguarding his homeland. Additionally, for preparation for the Castilian War of 1578, they made fortifications in Kampong Pintu Malim and named it "Pulau Ambok." Pengiran Bendahara Sakam successfully forced the occupiers to depart after organizing Bruneian forces and leading 1,000 warriors against them.

== Legacy ==
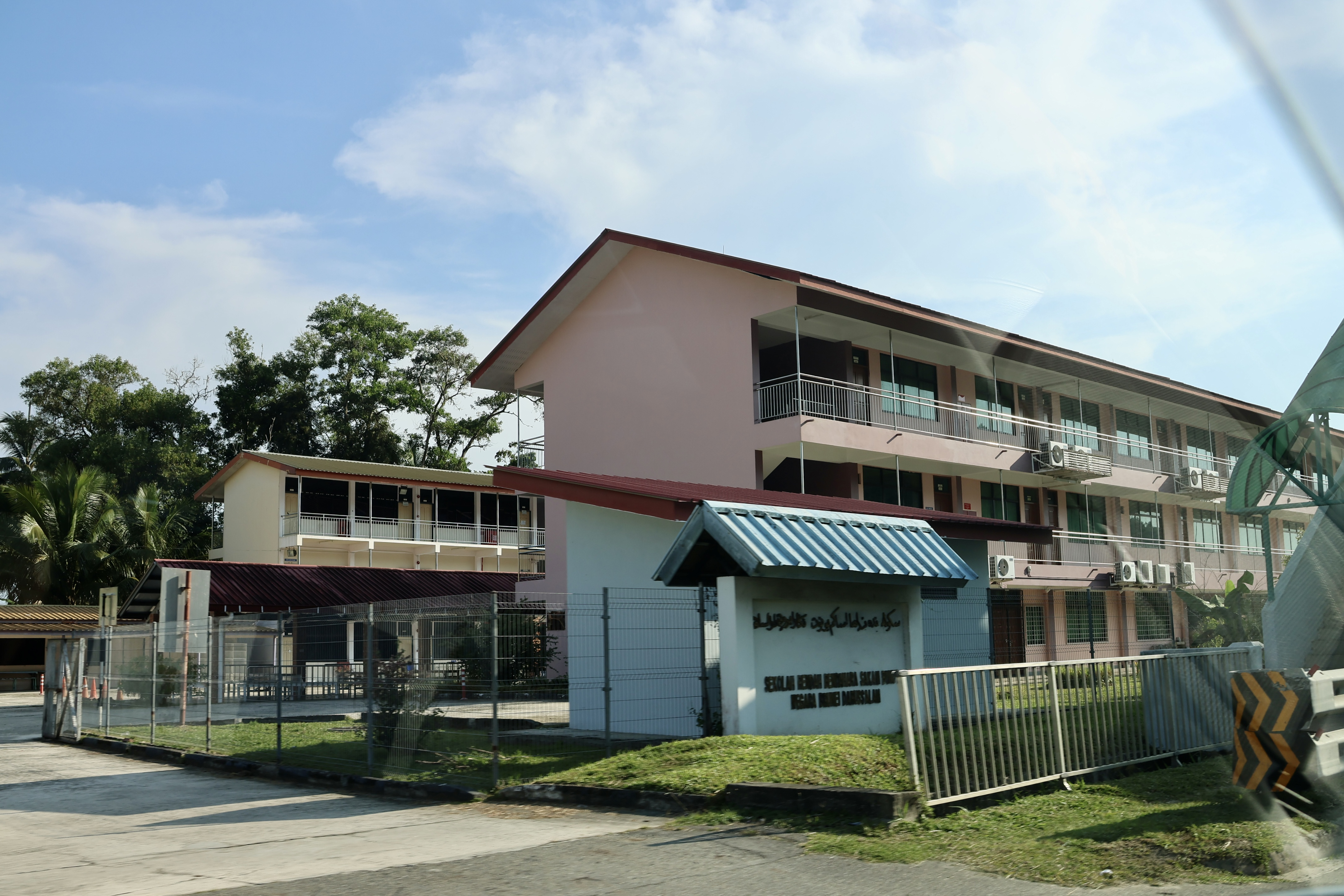
Bendahara Sakam Bunut Primary School

These days, the Castille War recounts the heroic deeds and tenacity of the Bruneian people, under the leadership of Pengiran Bendahara Sakam, in protecting their country from outside threats.

- Bendahara Sakam Bunut Primary School, a school in Kampong Bunut
- KRI Usman Harun (359), an Indonesian warship that was formerly named KDB Bendahara Sakam (29)

== See also ==
- Pengiran Indera Mahkota
- Raja Muda Hashim
- History of Brunei
