= Mukim Tamoi =

Mukim of Brunei

Coordinates: 4°53′2″N 114°56′9″E

- Mukim
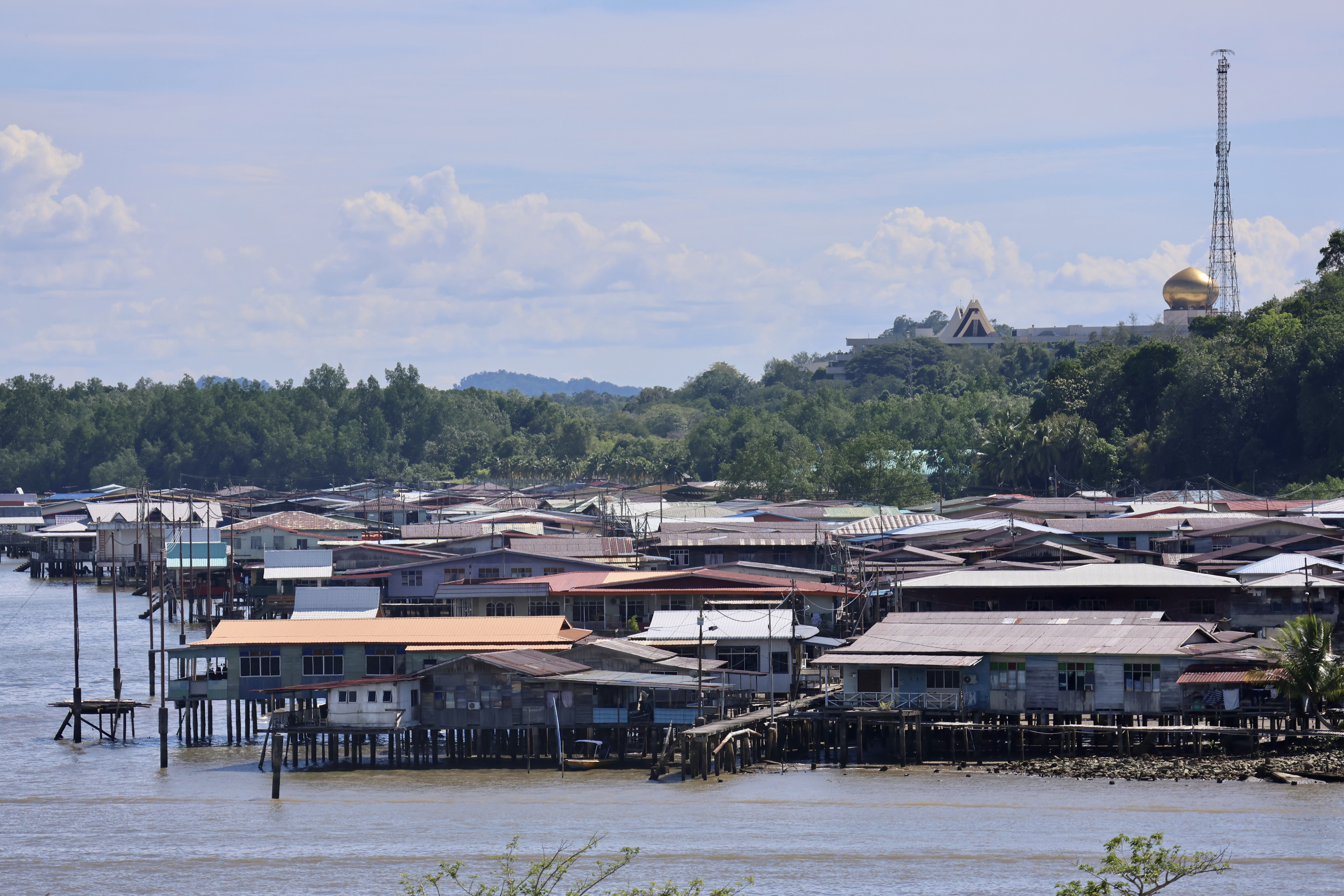
- Stilt houses in Mukim Tamoi, with Istana Nurul Iman in the background

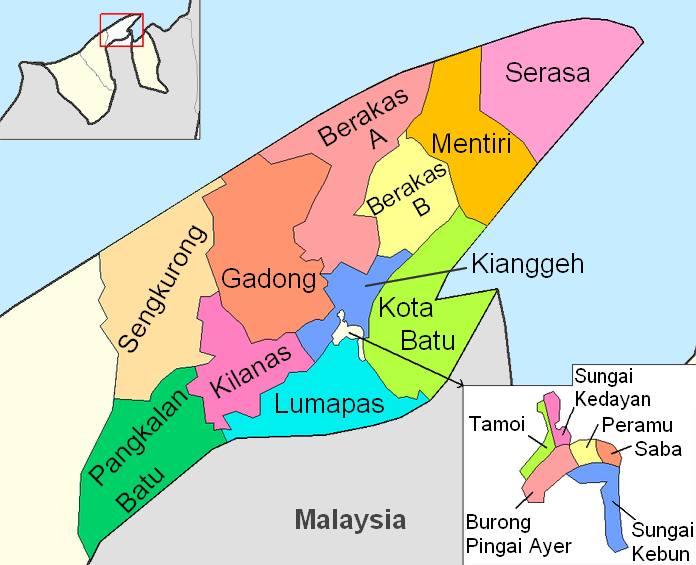
- Tamoi is in light green.
- Country: Brunei
- District: Brunei–Muara

Government
  - Penghulu: Raimi Rashid (Acting)

Area
  - Total: 51.76 ha (127.9 acres)

Population (2021)
  - Total: 942
  - Density: 1,820/km^{2} (4,710/sq mi)
- Time zone: UTC+8 (BNT)
- Postcode: BLxx12

Mukim Tamoi is a mukim in Brunei-Muara District, Brunei. It is part of Kampong Ayer, the traditional stilt settlements on the Brunei River in the country's capital Bandar Seri Begawan. The population was 1,389 in 2016.

== Etymology ==
The origin of Kampong Tamoi whether it is related to Kampung Tamoi Tengah or Kampung Tamoi Ujong in the past cannot be accurately confirmed. Even though its existence was once spoken orally through generations but what has been recorded in history books is that Kampong Tamoi is one of the oldest villages in the history of Kampong Ayer together with Kampong Saba, Kampong Burung Pingai and Kampong Sungai Kedayan. In the 18th century, the existence of Kampong Tamoi was once recorded on the map of Kampong Ayer, known as Kampong Tamoi Menengah only.

According to folk tale, Kampong Tamoi got its name from the event of defending the village from the fury of outsiders. As a result of the rampage of those outsiders who might intend to seize or create chaos, many villagers were killed and became victims. There was a man named Liau Haris where when the mobsters were not at home, he was looking for wood in Lumadan, which is now the location of Istana Nurul Iman, when he was told about the rioters Liau Haris returned home. At the time of the battle, Liau Haris who according to the story was a 'cleaner and fuller' tried to fight the rampaging enemy. Because both were reliable when fighting, the water started to rise and reached his back and Liau Haris stabbed his dagger into the ground and the enemy collapsed. Seeing the reliability that Liau Haris has, the villagers call him 'Tamamur Liau Haris atu eh' which means that really brave Liau Haris. The meaning of the word Tamamur is taken and becomes Tamoi. That is how the origin of the name was obtained but there are also different stories about the origin of the name Kampong Tamoi.

However, in the research carried out by the Brunei History Centre, it was recorded that Kampong Tamoi originated from the leadership of a person named Haji Tarif. His leadership was distinguished when he managed to lead the villagers to prevent and break the attack of the invaders who came from Limbang to control the village. Fortified with calico cloth and praying to Allah, the attack was repelled and the villagers succeeded in expelling the intruders. Above the authority and leadership of Haji Tarif and his obedience to the King, the word Tamoi appeared. Taking good sense from the name, a primary school was established to replace the old school and was named Sekolah Rendah Haji Tarif.

The mukim could be named after the village it encompasses.

== Geography ==
Mukim Tamoi is located in the waters of the Brunei River, starting from the intersection of the Kedayan River towards the upstream of the Brunei River is close to the Istana Darul Hana area which is on the mainland side.

== Demographics ==
As of 2016 census, the population was 1,389 with 49.5% males and 50.5% females. The mukim had 208 households occupying 207 dwellings. The entire population lived in urban areas. The entire population living in Mukim Tamoi is divided into two where Tamoi Tengah has a population of 421 with 63 houses, while Tamoi Ujong has a population of 262 and 32 houses. In addition to having existing facilities such as a mosque for the residents here attend schools, water supply and electricity. Those who have reached the age of 60 are also given attention by receiving their old-age pension where a total of 49 old-age pension recipients consist of residents of Tamoi Tengah, while 20 are from Tamoi Ujong, while welfare recipients are both more than 30 recipients.

== Administration ==
Kampong Limbongan and Kampong Ujong Bukit have since ceased to exist due to the redevelopment project to the Kedayan River and the construction of the public park Taman Mahkota Jubli Emas. The mukim has also been subsumed under the municipal area of Bandar Seri Begawan. As of 2021, the mukim comprised the following census villages:

Settlements	Population (2021)	Ketua kampung (2024)
Kampong Tamoi Ujong	136	Haji Tarip bin Haji Asgar
Kampong Tamoi Tengah	357	Haji Tarip bin Haji Asgar
Kampong Pengiran Tajuddin Hitam	147	Haji Tarip bin Haji Asgar
Kampong Pengiran Kerma Indera Lama	104	Haji Tarip bin Haji Asgar
Kampong Pengiran Bendahara Lama	198	Haji Tarip bin Haji Asgar
Kampong Limbongan	0	Haji Tarip bin Haji Asgar
Kampong Ujong Bukit	0	Haji Tarip bin Haji Asgar

== Villages ==
=== Kampung Tamoi Ujong ===
Kampong Tamoi Ujong or formerly known as Penganan Kingkin is located at the most extreme end of Mukim Tamoi, upstream of the Brunei River and borders Kampong Tamoi Tengah. It was previously named Kampung Penganan Kingkin because in this village there is a family whose job is only to make kuih cincin. The majority of the village population at this time is made up of Muslim Malay natives of the village who have lived there for generations. Until 2018, the village recorded a decreasing population with an estimated number of less than 200 people. The decline in the number of residents is caused by several factors such as the government's facilities in providing housing plans for the people, as well as some residents being involved in several disasters such as fires and house collapses. In recent years, this village has become a highlight for tourists and foreign dignitaries to visit here to see up close the traditions and life in Kampong Ayer.

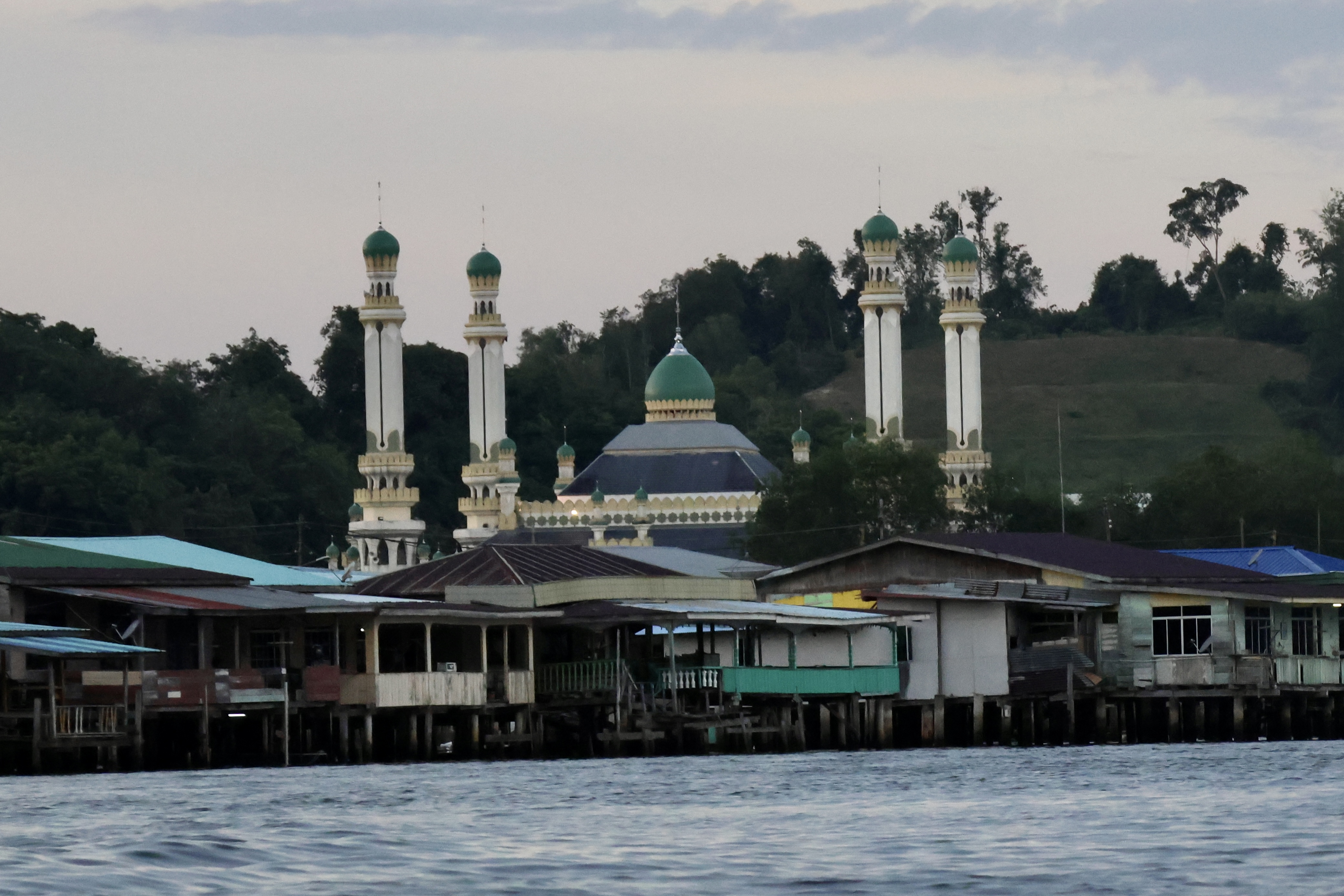
Kampong Tamoi Tengah

=== Kampong Tamoi Tengah ===
Kampong Tamoi Tengah is the largest village in Mukim Tamoi, since this village has a wide area, there used to be several names in it including: Pencalap, Tendar, Pedaun, Barang Sungai and others. The population is currently estimated at 320 people. The reduction of population in this village is the same as the one in Kampong Tamoi Ujong and other villages in Kampong Ayer. Currently, most of the residents in this village work with the government in addition to the private sector and no less are self-employed. While in the past, most of them only worked on their own whether it was catching fish such as fishing, peeling tree barks, collecting stones and so on. While the women are only housewives in addition to doing side jobs such as roofing, making baskets, making tray covers and so on.

=== Kampong Pengiran Pekerma Indera Lama ===
Kampong Pengiran Pekerma Indera Lama is located between Kampong Pengiran Tajuddin Hitam and Kampong Pengiran Bandahara Lama. As of 2018, the population is currently estimated at 115 people. According to information passed down by generations, the origin of the village was the residence of the children of Sultan Omar Ali Saifuddin I along with his followers and men. The village was initially called Pengiran Pekerma Indera Lama Pengiran Anak Apong and it was because of the name of a cheteria nobleman. In the past, the average male population in the village worked as a sweeper, collecting stones and collecting wood, while the female population's work was only making kajang (things woven from nipah leaves), weaving nyiru, roofing and so on. While currently most of the villagers work in the government, private sector in addition to being self-employed.

=== Kampong Pengiran Tajuddin Hitam ===
Kampong Pengiran Tajuddin Hitam is located between Kampong Pengiran Pekerma Indera Lama and Kampong Tamoi Tengah in the ulu (inner) section. As of 2018, it is inhabited by about 200 residents. The history of the existence of the village is the same as the existence of Kampong Pengiran Pekerma Indera Lama and Kampong Pengiran Bendahara Lama. According to the residents, the name of the village is taken from the name of a person who is from the descendants of Pengiran-Pengiran according to whom his tombstone was turned into stone and is located in the area of the royal tomb. Entering the 1960s and early 1970s the condition of the houses in the village and some in Kampong Ayer began to change where the houses began to be built with concrete pillars and zinc roofs and board walls.

=== Kampong Pengiran Bendahara Lama ===
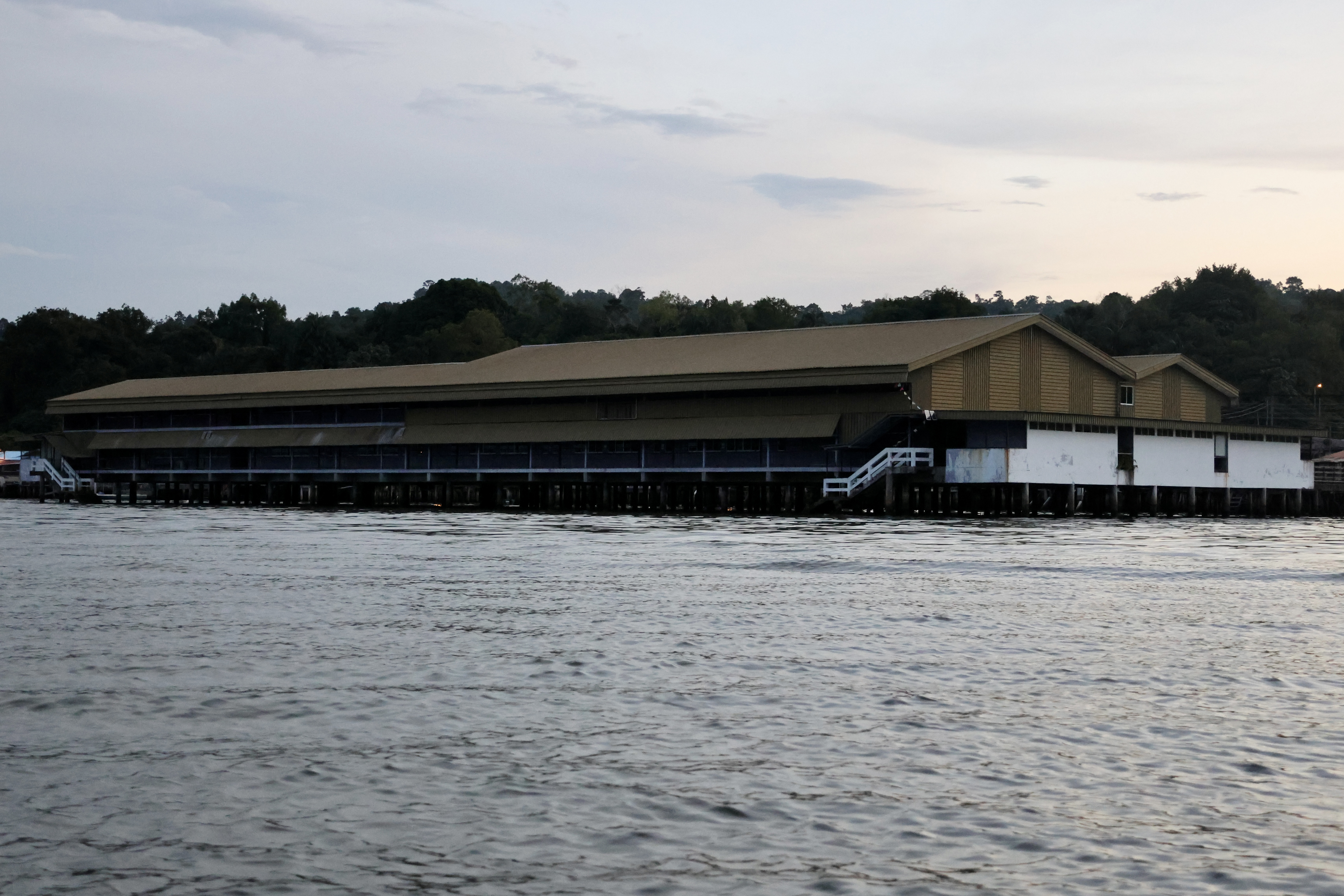
Pengiran Bendahara Lama Primary School

The position of this village is bordered by Kampong Pengiran Pekerma Indera Lama and faces Kampong Ujong Tanjong towards the city center separated by Kedayan River. The existence of the village is the same as Kampong Pengiran Pekerma Indera and Kampong Pengiran Tajuddin Hitam. According to the residents, it used to be known as Kampong Lama Masjid. He said the name Pengiran Bendahara is taken from the name of the first vizier of the sultanate in this country who is believed to have lived in the village in the 19th century. Lama Masjid is connected to Kampong Bendahara Lama, and is one of the oldest mosques ever built in this country and is located in the village. The mosque (with thatched roof and brick walls) has been destroyed for a long time but the remnants of the remains of the building can still be seen to this day and it is located near Bakut Syeikh Haji Ibrahim. Not far from Bakut Syeikh Haji Ibrahim according to Awang Haji Hamid again, there is another bamboo named Bakut Jambu. On the bakut there used to be many fragments of old ceramics, pieces of pitis, kuit, old coins as well as former large pillars which are believed to be the former site of Istana Pengiran Bendahara Lama.

Folklore holds that the location of Sultan Abdul Momin's Istana Lama (Old Palace) is adjacent to Kampong Pengiran Bendahara Lama's waters. Back then, the region was surrounded by stones acting as a city wall to hold the land down and prevent the wall stones from falling. Since both large and small boats that traverse the path to the inner Gadong River are eroding the stone walls and slopes of the area of the palace, the historic site is no longer discernible and may eventually vanish.

=== Kampong Ujong Bukit ===
The villages of Ujong Bukit and Limbongan are located on the banks of the Kedayan River. Its position faces Kampong Bukit Salat and leads to Gadong River bordering Kampong Sumbiling Baru. The village currently no longer exists when the area is involved in the Bandar Seri Begawan reclamation project. All the residents had to be moved to several Government Housing Plans such as the National Housing Plan in Kampong Panchor since July 2017. The origin of Kampong Ujong Bukit started from the occupation of its residents who at that time worked as forger of copper items. The village had several names before becoming Kampung Ujong Bukit, such as Pulau Pandaian and Pandai Kawat, the latter meant good at making copper items. People of the village originally built houses in the water area near Pulau Pandaian (Pandaian Island). The work of copper is done on Pandaian Island which is now used as a burial place for Muslims. Difficulties are encountered when the water is shallow, which is why the craftsman's place had to move from Pandaian Island to Ujong Bukit. Ujong Bukit was chosen because it was so easy to get water.

Kampong Limbungan was not the name of a village at first but the name of a place for the port of merchant ships. Trading ships would often anchor there and would clean their ships before continuing their voyage. Due to the frequent anchoring there are merchants who began living there with the number increasing over time.

== Economy ==
Although Mukim Tamoi is not too prominent with its products, it still produces some products produced by the villagers such as crackers, cookies, dried fish and so on. However, it is clear from the Ketua Kampong Tamoi Tengah and Tamoi Ujong, Awang Tarip bin Haji Asgar, that the people of Tamoi Village are famous for their prowess in boat racing, which has been proven since time immemorial. According to him, this excellence is the result of the nature of agreement and seriousness as well as the spirit of cooperation practiced by the residents. Apart from that, the techniques and experience they gained especially in 'working' on the boat helped them win. The unity of the spirit of the participants and the rowing techniques and the boats produced make the people of Kampung Tamoi always excel in the competition.

In generating a self-sustaining economy, some people in this village are very active in trading food such as cakes, cooking, and also catching fish on a small scale. Residents in this village also put a lot of emphasis on living a united and harmonious life by holding a village meal, participating in mukim events and participating in the Majlis Ibadah Korban Jabatan Daerah Brunei Muara. The villagers are also active in the field of sports such as organizing a nine-player football team and managed to get saved financial results as much as BND$500 in 2012.

== Infrastructure ==
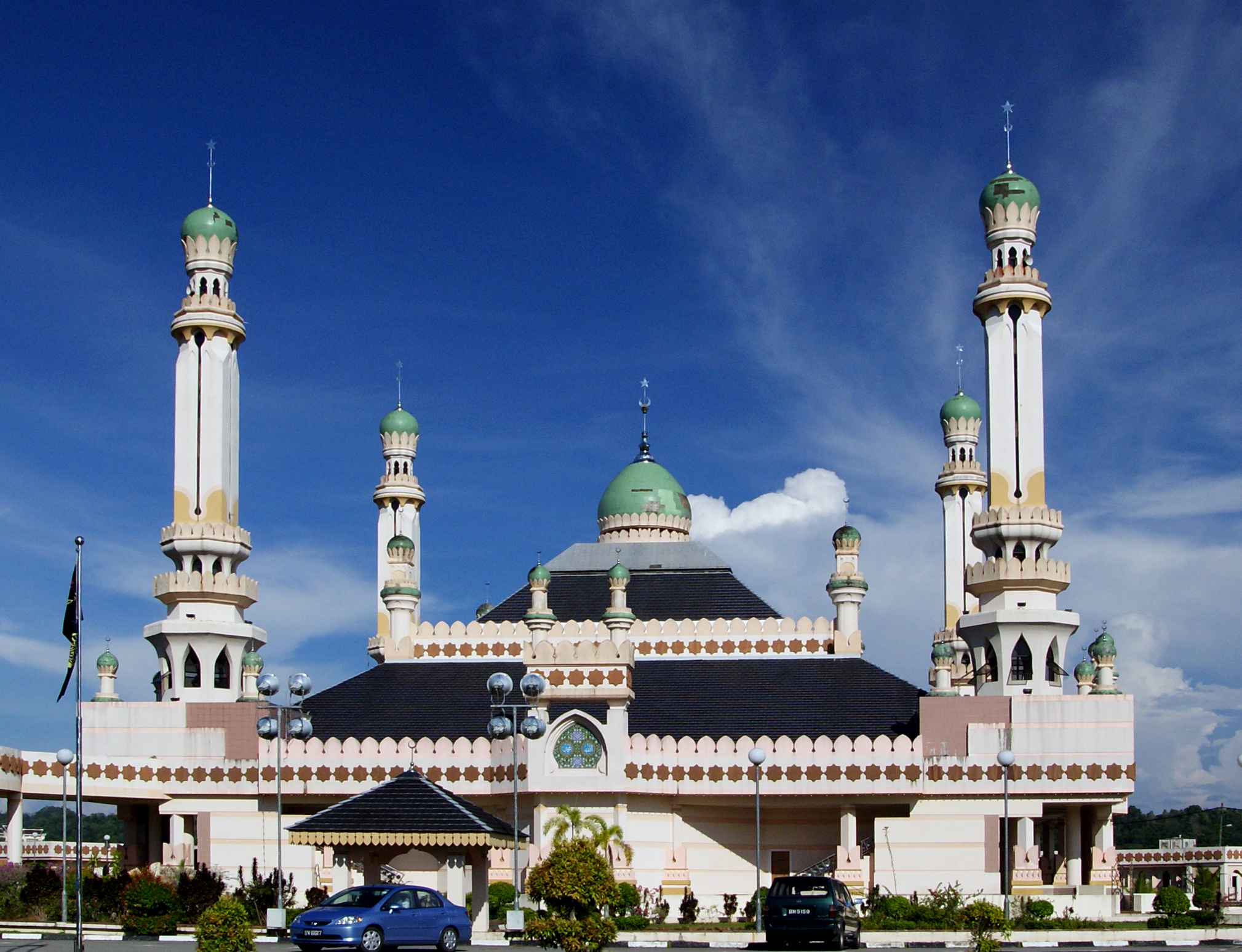
Duli Pengiran Muda Mahkota Pengiran Muda Haji Al-Muhtadee Billah Mosque

The local primary schools include Bendahara Lama Primary School and Haji Tarif Primary School, with the latter replacing Tamoi Tengah Malay School (SMTT). Each school also houses a sekolah ugama ("religious school") i.e. school for the country's Islamic religious primary education in Brunei. (Note: The religious schools are Bendahara Lama Religious School and Haji Tarif Religious School.)

Duli Pengiran Muda Mahkota Pengiran Muda Haji Al-Muhtadee Billah Mosque (Note: Commonly abbreviated as DPMMPMHAMB Mosque) is the sole local mosque. The construction began in August 1995; it was opened on 16 January 1999. It can accommodate 1,500 worshippers. The mosque is named after the Crown Prince Al-Muhtadee Billah.
