= Edinburgh Bridge =

Arch bridge in Brunei

Edinburgh Bridge Jambatan Edinburgh
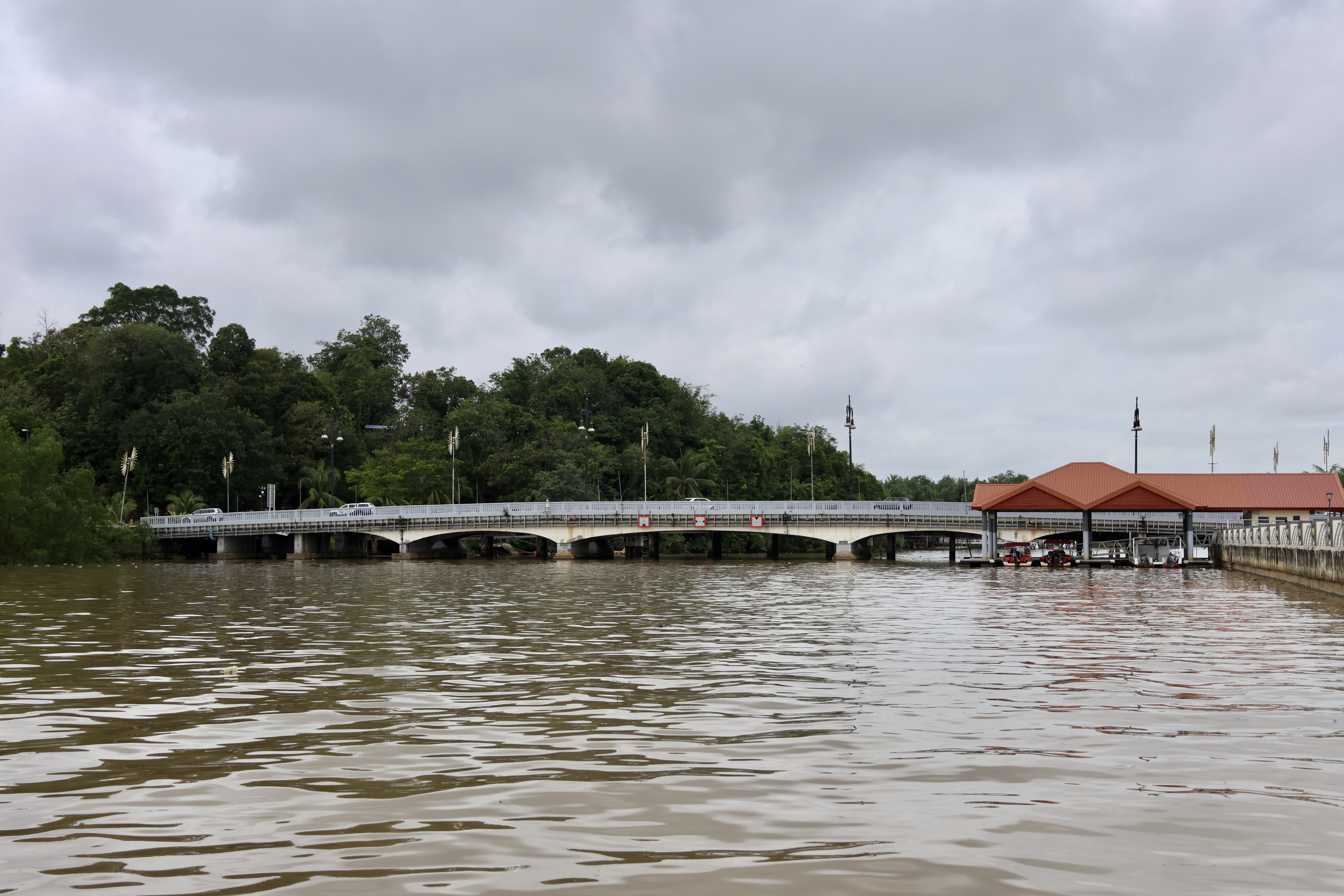
- Edinburgh Bridge in 2022
- Coordinates: 4.893261°N 114.935242°E
- Carries: Jalan Raja Isteri Pengiran Anak Saleha
- Crosses: Kedayan River
- Locale: Bandar Seri Begawan
- Named for: Prince Philip, Duke of Edinburgh
- Maintained by: Public Works Department

Characteristics
- Design: Arch
- Material: Concrete
- No. of lanes: 4

History
- Construction cost: B$2,219,000
- Opened: 28 February 1959; 66 years ago

Edinburgh Bridge, built in 1959, is a two-lane structure that spans the Kedayan River, connecting the city centre to the rest of the capital city of Brunei, Bandar Seri Begawan. Replacing the older Clifford Bridge, it became one of Brunei's earliest bridges, significantly enhancing connectivity and urban development. As a result, it stands as a notable landmark in the capital.

== Location ==
The Edinburgh Bridge is situated along Jalan Tutong, near the Bandar Seri Begawan Fire Station and the Supreme Court building, spanning the Kedayan River and linking Brunei's capital to the Tutong and Belait Districts. The route leading to the bridge, formerly known as Jalan Sultan, originally connected Bandar Seri Begawan (then Brunei Town) to the Kianggeh River. In 2012, Jalan Sultan was renamed Jalan Sultan Haji Omar Ali Saifuddien, while the section previously called Jalan Tutong was renamed Jalan Raja Isteri Pengiran Anak Saleha. The bridge forms part of Bandar Seri Begawan's urban landscape, where key waterways, including the Brunei River to the south, Kianggeh River to the east, and Kedayan River to the west, shape the city's layout. After crossing the Edinburgh Bridge, Jalan Tutong continues westward past the Batu Satu neighbourhood.

== History ==
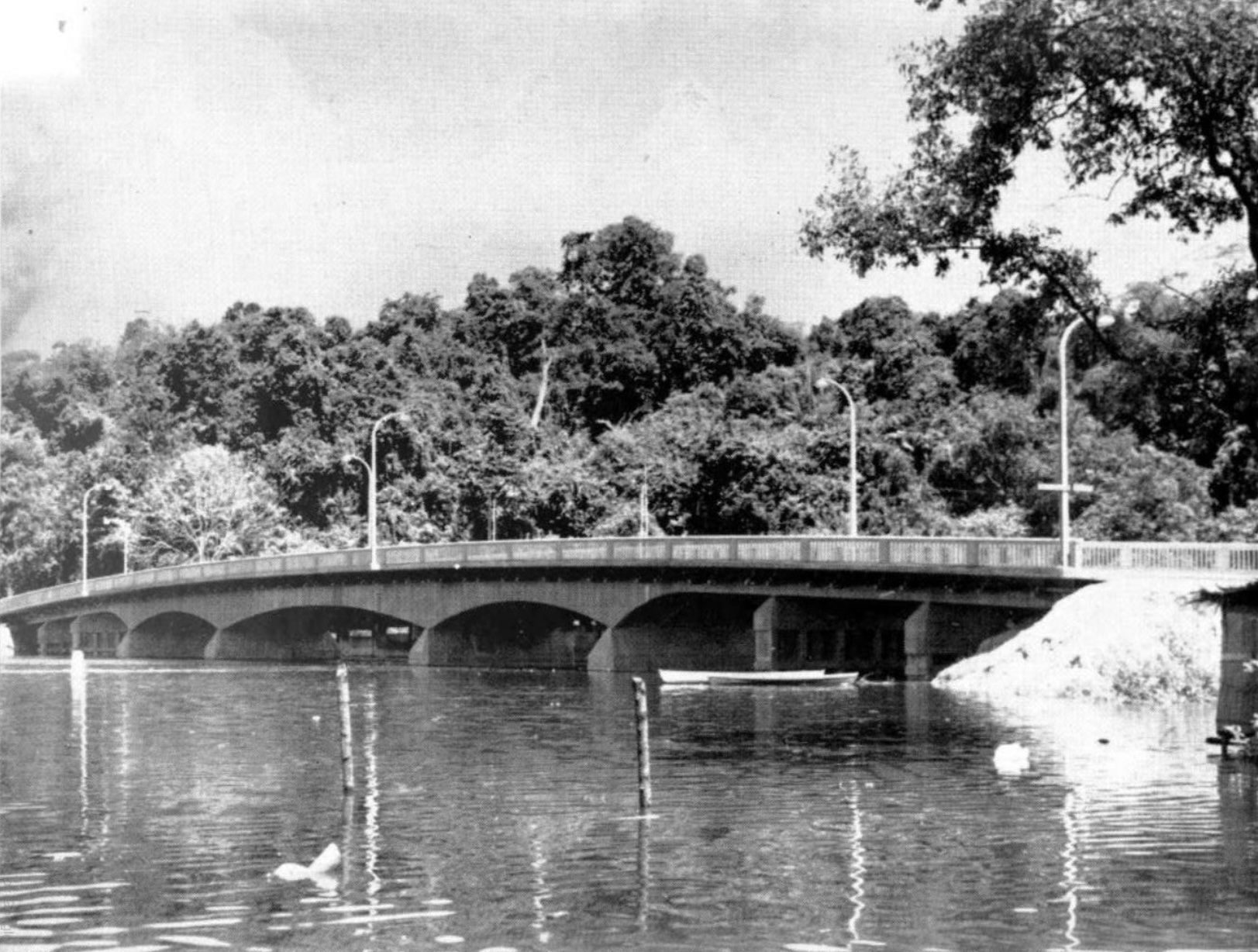
Edinburgh Bridge in 1959

In 1927, a contract was awarded to replace the wooden bridge spanning the Kedayan River with a 360-foot (110 m) reinforced concrete structure, which was more than halfway completed by the end of the year. The construction cost of this bridge was B$80,000.00, and it was completed in 1928. In May 1929, Sir Hugh Clifford and his wife made their first visit to Brunei, where they officially inaugurated the newly completed bridge, finished just days before their arrival. Named in his honour, the Clifford Bridge (Note: It is sometimes referred to as the "Rangas Bridge.") was formally opened during a ceremony on Empire Day, marking a significant milestone in Brunei's infrastructure development. The bridge became a vital link across the Kedayan River to Kampong Pusar Ulak. Its importance grew in the early 1950s when nearby areas, including Kampong Sumbiling Lama and Kampong Bukit Salat, were relocated to make way for the construction of the Omar Ali Saifuddien Mosque. By the end of 1953, the Clifford Bridge was reinforced with braces to prevent lateral movement, and guniting was applied to conceal exposed steel reinforcements.

The construction of Edinburgh Bridge was one of four new bridges built under the 1st National Development Plan as part of Sultan Omar Ali Saifuddien III's efforts to develop and strengthen Brunei's infrastructure and social services during the 1950s. By 1956, plans for the new bridge were underway, with road designs completed and the filling and partial paving of the approach nearly finished. However, delays arose due to the need to remove and reposition telephone poles and lines before the road could be fully utilised. Built entirely from concrete, Edinburgh Bridge in Bandar Seri Begawan was completed around 1957 and was included in the first phase of the B$70,000,000 road and bridge plan, with its construction costing $2,219,000.

The Edinburgh Bridge was built on the site of the former Clifford Bridge and was named in honour of the Duke of Edinburgh's first visit to Brunei in 1959. The Duke himself officiated the bridge's opening on 28 February 1959 at 3:26 p.m. Later that year, on 18 March, the bridge became a significant landmark when the sultan and his delegation departed for London for constitutional negotiations with the British government. As they passed the bridge, about 5,000 people gathered to bid them farewell, with schoolchildren from various ethnic groups, including Chinese and Malay, lining the road for miles, waving and wishing them well. The bridge stood as a major symbol of Brunei's progress as the sultan embarked on this historic journey.

In later developments, Edinburgh Bridge was renovated and expanded into a four-lane road in 1970. Since the inauguration of Taman Mahkota Jubli Emas in 2017, it has become part of a trio of the city's most renowned landmarks, alongside the nearby Omar Ali Saifuddien Mosque and Istana Darussalam.
