= Pengiran Umar =

Bruneian police commissioner (1940–2023)

Yang Amat Mulia Pengiran Putera Negara Pengiran Umar PSPNB PSLJ DSNB DPMB PSM PHBS PBLI CPM PJK
- ڤڠيرن عمر
- Official portrait

Commissioner of Police
- In office 1 January 1984 – 31 March 1991
- Monarch: Hassanal Bolkiah
- Preceded by: Pengiran Jaya
- Succeeded by: Abdul Rahman Besar

Personal details
- Born: Awangku Umar bin Pengiran Apong; 2 February 1940 Kampong Kianggeh, Brunei Town, Brunei
- Died: 12 May 2023 (aged 83) Raja Isteri Pengiran Anak Saleha Hospital, Bandar Seri Begawan, Brunei
- Resting place: Kianggeh Muslim Cemetery, Bandar Seri Begawan, Brunei
- Spouse: Suraya Harun
- Relatives: Pengiran Ibnu Basit (brother)
- Education: Sultan Omar Ali Saifuddien College
- Police career
- Country: Brunei
- Department: Royal Brunei Police Force
- Service years: 1957–1991
- Rank: Commissioner

Pengiran Umar bin Pengiran Haji Apong (Note: The alternate spelling of his given name is "Pengiran Omar" rather than "Pengiran Umar.") (2 February 1940 – 12 May 2023) was a Bruneian diplomat and noble police officer who served as the second commissioner of the Royal Brunei Police Force (RBPF) from 1984 to 1991.

== Early life and education ==
Awangku Umar bin Pengiran Apong was born in Kampong Kianggeh, Brunei Town (present-day Bandar Seri Begawan) on 2 February 1940, the son of Pengiran Datu Penghulu Pengiran Haji Apong bin Pengiran Saifuddin, who served as the ketua kampung of Sungai Kianggeh. He began his early education at St. George's Mission School, before continuing at Sultan Muhammad Jamalul Alam Malay School in 1950, and later attending Sultan Omar Ali Saifuddien College.

== Police career ==
Awangku Umar began his service with the Brunei Police Force as a recruit in 1957. He was stationed in Kuching, Sarawak, for 9 months in 1958 and was awarded the title of "Best Recruit from Brunei" during the graduation ceremony. Later being promoted to corporal in 1959, and sergeant in early 1960. In April 1960, Sergeant Awangku Umar was sent to Kuala Lumpur to mentor Brunei recruits undergoing training at the Royal Federation of Malayan Police's training centre. After completing an eight-month programme, he returned to Brunei in mid-1961 with 27 newly trained police officers, having been responsible for overseeing the trainees.

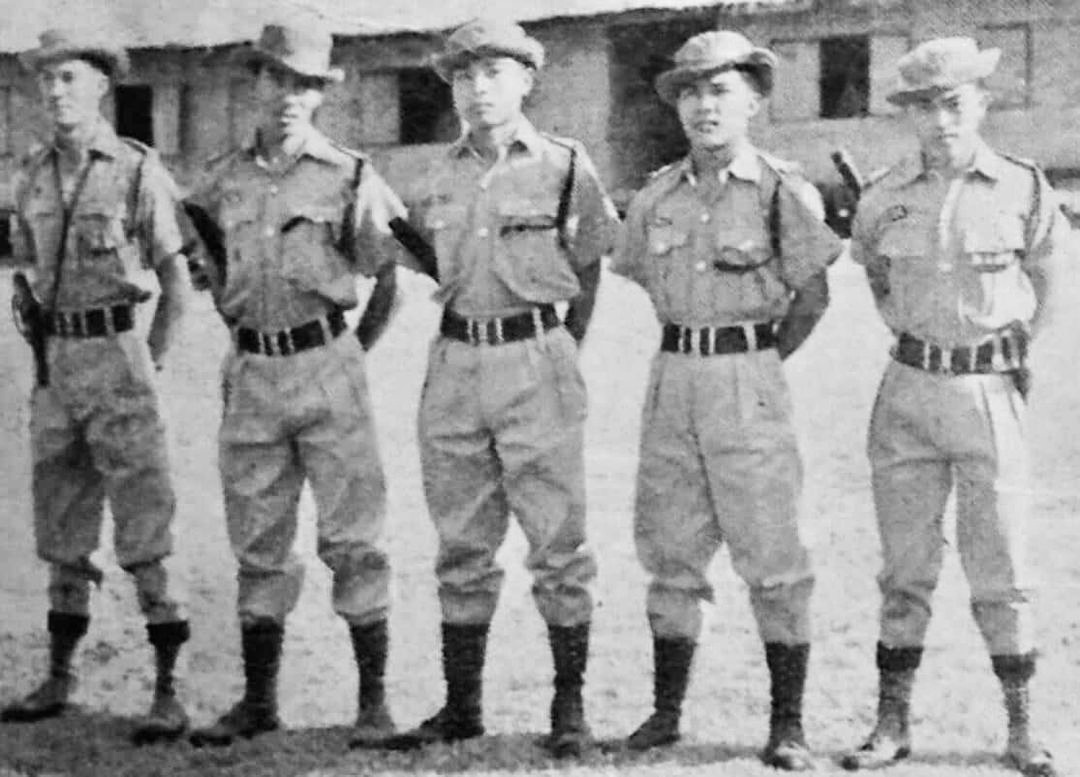
Awangku Umar (first from left) in Kampong Kiudang, 1961

On 25 July 1961, Sergeant Awangku Umar led a team of Bruneian police officers in the successful apprehension of an Iban man suspected of murdering five people in Kampong Kiudang, Tutong District. The arrest took place at 9:30 am on 3 August in a forested area between Lamunin and Mungkom. Awangku Umar's leadership in the operation, which brought relief to the local community, earned him commendation from Police Commissioner A.N. Outram. Later that year, he was promoted to the rank of inspector and transferred to the Reserve Police Unit for Riot Control. In March 1963, he was reassigned to the Special Branch, where he continued his service. A Brunei Police spokesperson later confirmed that Awangku Umar had been selected for training in the United Kingdom and was scheduled to depart soon. In April 1965, he was promoted to assistant superintendent of police. On 9 June 1965, he left for London via Singapore to attend a two-month Special Branch course, returning on 18 July.

Following Brunei's independence on 1 January 1984, Pengiran Umar was appointed as police commissioner. From 1984 to 1986, he oversaw the Royal Brunei Police Force, which included Department 'B' (the Criminal Department), the Royal Police Control Branch, Department 'C' (the Communications Branch), the Marine Police Branch, the Airport Police Branch, Department 'D' (responsible for police buildings, sports, and welfare), and Department 'F' (which comprised the Special Operations Unit, Reserve Unit, Action Squad, Motorcycle Squad, Dog Care and Training Unit, and the Commissioner's Reserve). In 1987, the force underwent a restructuring, forming a new organisational structure consisting of the Administration Department, the Logistics and Finance Department (Department 'C'), the Sports Welfare and Buildings Department (Department 'D'), and the Operations Department. He launched the first Neighbourhood Watch in Kampong Madang was officially launched on 28 April 1989.

Pengiran Umar was involved in the case Marsal v. Apong and Others, where the appellant claimed wrongful imprisonment from August 1986 to April 1990 following a dispute at Brunei International Airport. The key issue was whether the Court of Appeal was correct in upholding the respondents' limitation defence under the Limitation Act (1967), despite accusations of conspiracy and negligence. Central to the case was the 1991 Emergency (Limitation) Order, which extended the limitation period for false imprisonment from one to six years. The court ruled that the 1991 Order did not retroactively extend expired limitation periods under the 1967 Act, thus upholding the dismissal of the appeal and clarifying the order's scope. Pengiran Umar served as police commissioner until 31 March 1991.

== Later life and death ==
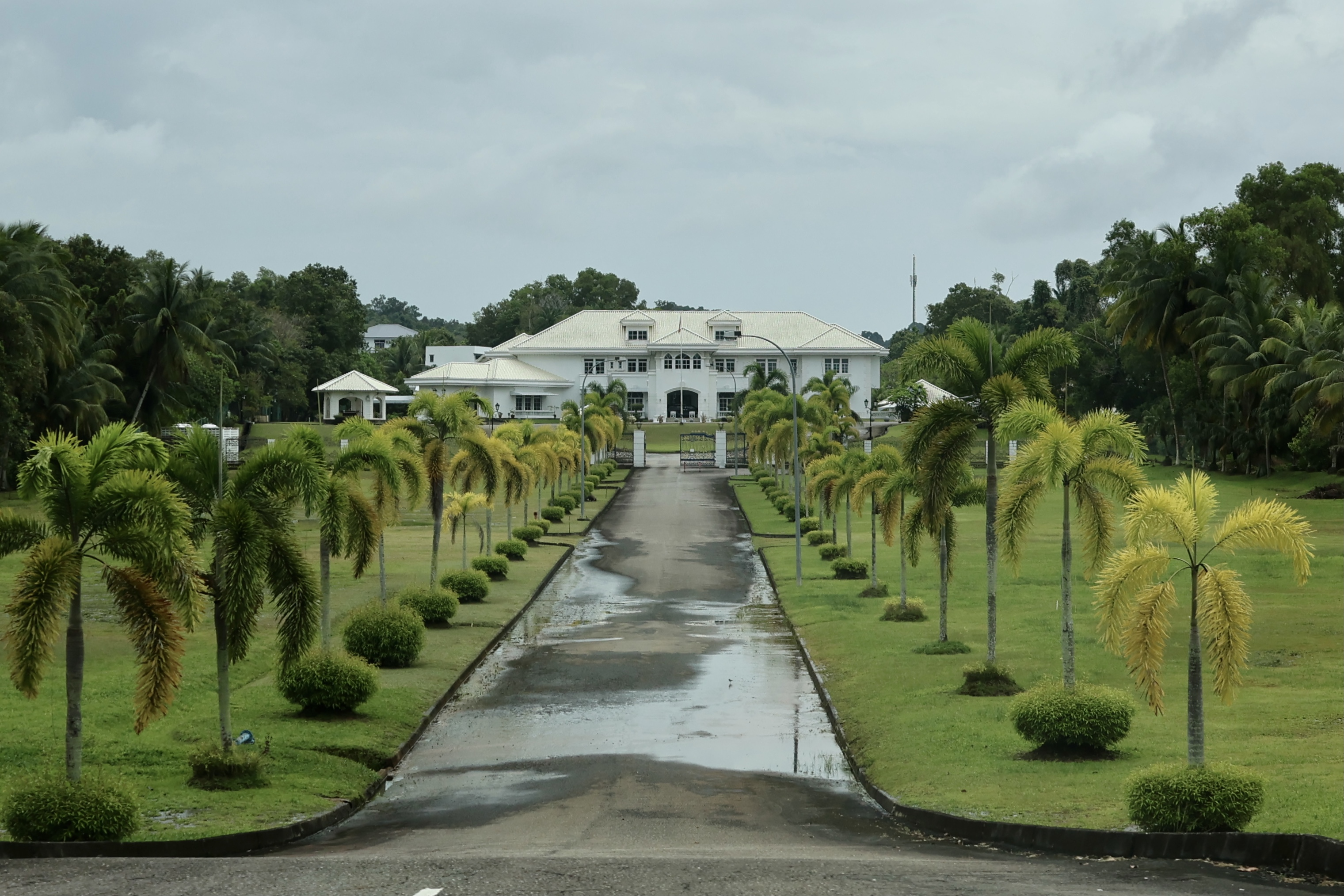
Residence of Pengiran Umar in Salambigar, Bandar Seri Begawan

After retiring from his police career, Pengiran Umar was appointed ambassador to South Korea and high commissioner to Singapore in 1993. He later became a member of the Privy Council in 2018.

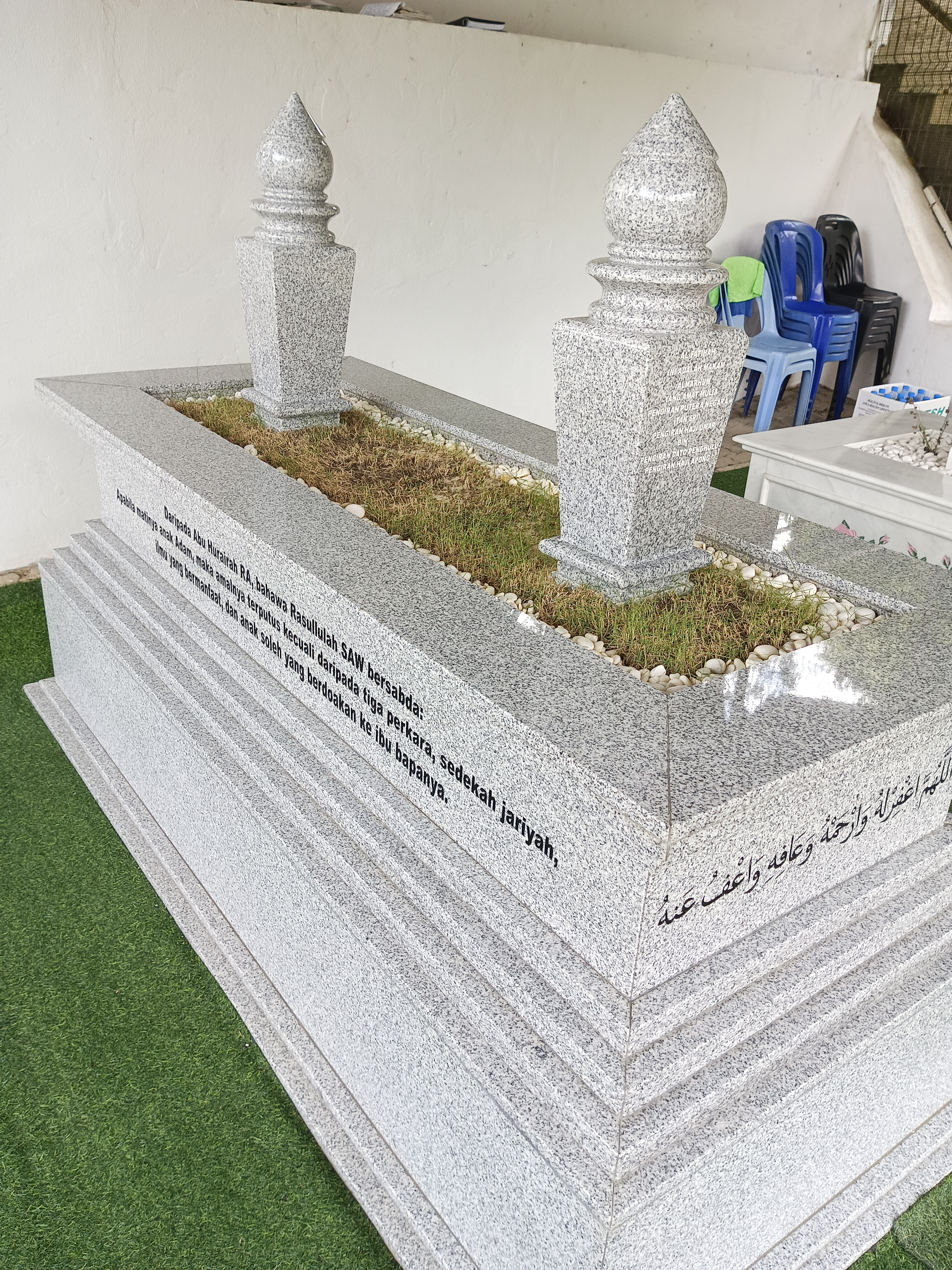
Grave of Pengiran Umar Apong at Kianggeh Muslim Cemetery

Pengiran Umar died at the age of 83 at Raja Isteri Pengiran Anak Saleha Hospital on 12 May 2023. His funeral was attended by Sultan Hassanal Bolkiah and Crown Prince Al-Muhtadee Billah, who joined the congregational funeral prayer led by Salim Besar at his residence in Kampong Salambigar. He was later laid to rest at the Kianggeh Muslim Cemetery. The Naubat was closed for 20 days after his death. Pengiran Anak Abdul Aziz presided over a ceremony to reopen the Naubat at the Lapau on 31 May. Tahlil recitations, prayers, and a congregational Maghrib prayer were all part of the ceremony.

== Personal life ==
Pengiran Umar was married to Datin Hajah Suraya binti Harun, a Malaysian actress who died in 2016. She served as the president of the Welfare Body of Police's Wives and Families from 1984 to 1991. Additionally, he has a brother, Pengiran Ibnu Basit, who served as the deputy minister of defence from 1986 to 2005.

== Titles, styles and honours ==
=== Titles and styles ===
Personal standard of Pengiran Putera Negara

On 10 August 1972, Pengiran Umar was honoured by Sultan Hassanal Bolkiah with the cheteria title of Pengiran Putera Negara, bearing the style Yang Amat Mulia.

=== Honours ===
Pengiran Umar has been bestowed the following honours:

National

- Order of Paduka Seri Laila Jasa First Class (PSLJ) – Dato Paduka Seri Laila Jasa
- Order of Paduka Seri Laila Jasa Third Class (SLJ)
- Order of Pahlawan Negara Brunei First Class (PSPNB; 10 February 1976) – Dato Seri Pahlawan
- Order of Pahlawan Negara Brunei Fourth Class (PJB)
- Order of Setia Negara Brunei Second Class (DSNB) – Dato Setia
- Order of Seri Paduka Mahkota Brunei Second Class (DPMB; 15 July 1970) – Dato Paduka
- Sultan Hassanal Bolkiah Medal (PHBS; 1968)
- Pingat Bakti Laila Ikhlas (PBLI)
- Meritorious Service Medal (PJK; 1968)
- Police Long Service Medal (PKLP)
- General Service Medal (Police)
- Campaign Medal

Foreign

- Malaysia :
  - Honorary Commander of the Order of Loyalty to the Crown of Malaysia (PSM; 1989)
- United Kingdom:
  - Colonial Police Medal (CPM; 1969)

== Notes ==
Police appointments
Preceded by Pengiran Jaya	Commissioner of Police	Succeeded by Abdul Rahman Besar
