= Limbongan =

Limbongan may refer to:

- Limbongan, Brunei
- Limbongan (state constituency), Malaysia
