= Sultan Shah =

Sultan Shah may refer to:

- Shah Berunai, eighth Sultan of Brunei
- Shah Jahan Begum of Bhopal, ruler of Bhopal from 1844–1860 and 1868–1901
- Sultan Shah ibn Radwan, Seljuk sultan of Aleppo
- Sultan Shah of Khwarezm, claimant to the title of Khwarazmshah
- Sultan Shahriar Rashid Khan, Bangladeshi army officer
