= Saiful Rijal =

Sultan of Brunei (r. 1533–1581)

Saiful Rijal سيف الرجال

Sultan of Brunei
- Reign: 1530–1581
- Predecessor: Abdul Kahar
- Successor: Shah Brunei
- Born: Brunei
- Died: c.1581 Istana Mazagong, Brunei Town, Brunei
- Burial: Kianggeh Muslim Cemetery, Kianggeh, Bandar Seri Begawan, Brunei
- Issue Detail: Sultan Shah Brunei; Sultan Muhammad Hasan; Raja Bonda; Pengiran Anak Kasim
- Father: Sultan Abdul Kahar
- Religion: Sunni Islam

Saiful Rijal (Note: His name is also spelled as Saiful Rehal and Saiful Rizal,) (died c. 1581) was the sultan of Brunei from 1530 until 1581, the year he is alleged to have died. He was succeeded by his eldest son Shah Brunei.

Its as during his reign, when the Castilian War occurred between the empires of the Brunei and Spain. In addition to the Philippines, he was also renowned for spreading Islamic teachings throughout Borneo. According to folk tales about his palace being located on King's Island (Pulau Raja) in Jerudong. The sultan was also known as Sultan Lixar, and Sultan Nula Alan by the Spaniards.

== Reign ==
=== Ascension ===
Pengiran Muda Chuchu Besar Saiful Rijal was the eldest son of Pengiran Bendahara Pg Muhammad Tajuddin Ibni Sultan Bolkiah. A significant statement from the Boxer Codex, likely written by a Tagalog merchant who lived in Brunei, describes Saiful Rijal as a cheerful and stout man, noting that he was fifty-eight years old in 1589. This suggests that Saiful Rijal was born in 1531. Given the timeline, a direct father-to-son succession between 1514/15 and 1531 is genetically implausible. Therefore, if these dates are accurate and considering the four sultans from Sharif Ali to Abdul Kahar, it indicates that there must have been a succession of brothers at some point in the royal lineage. There is no information of when Saiful Rijal began to govern, but he was co-regnant with his uncle, Abdul Kahar, in 1578.

=== Castilian War ===
Exchanges between the Bornean port cities and the Spaniards who had taken control of the Philippine islands by seizing Manila in 1571 and Cebu in 1565. Manila charged Brunei of conducting Muslim missionary activities in the Philippines because of the Spaniards' zealous proselytising efforts to convert the entire archipelago to Christianity. In a letter dated 13 April 1578, to Brunei's Sultan Saiful Rijal, the Spanish Governor of the Philippines, Francisco de Sande, made the following accusation and gave the following order.

…it has been rumoured that you have tried and are trying to do us harm, and to make war upon us: that you have tried to induce and have solicited the natives of Lucon [Luzon and other districts to rebel and revolt against us, that you have sent spies to Cebu and other districts: that you have left your residence for this purpose of warring against us with a fleet of ships. ...that you shall send no preachers of the sect of Mahoma[d] to any part of these islands, nor to the heathen among the Tingues [hill-people], nor into other parts of your own island.

Brunei disregarded the order as well as the accusations. In revenge, the Spaniards attacked and took control of Brunei in the same month in 1578. Additionally with the assistance of two defectors, Pengiran Seri Lela and Pengiran Seri Ratna. When the Spaniards captured the capital, he chose to move the country's capital to Saragua, further emphasizing the importance of Sarawak. He also had to retreat to Piragong, in Ulu Sungai Brunei to strengthen the Brunei army. Moreover, to demonstrates the significant impact Brunei had on the nearby areas at the time, the Sultan ordered the reconstruction of their capital city when the Spaniards left Brunei probably in late July 1578.

=== Death ===
Sultan Saiful Rijal reportedly became ill near Bintala, but he later reportedly recovered and went back to Brunei. He resided in Istana Mazagong in Sungai Kedayan, where he allegedly died. He is buried at Kianggeh Muslim Cemetery.

== Personal life ==
Sultan Saiful Rijal had the following issue:

- Sultan Shah Brunei, 8th Sultan of Brunei
- Sultan Muhammad Hasan, 9th Sultan of Brunei
- Pengiran Anak Kasim
- Raja Bonda (Puteri Lamturak), consort to Sultan Abdul Ghafur Muhiuddin Shah

== Legacy ==
- IBTE Sultan Saiful Rijal Campus, school in Bandar Seri Begawan.

== See also ==
- List of sultans of Brunei

== Notes ==
Regnal titles
| Preceded by Abdul Kahar | Sultan of Brunei; 1533–1581 | Succeeded by Shah Brunei |
