= Castilian War =

Military conflict between Brunei and Spain

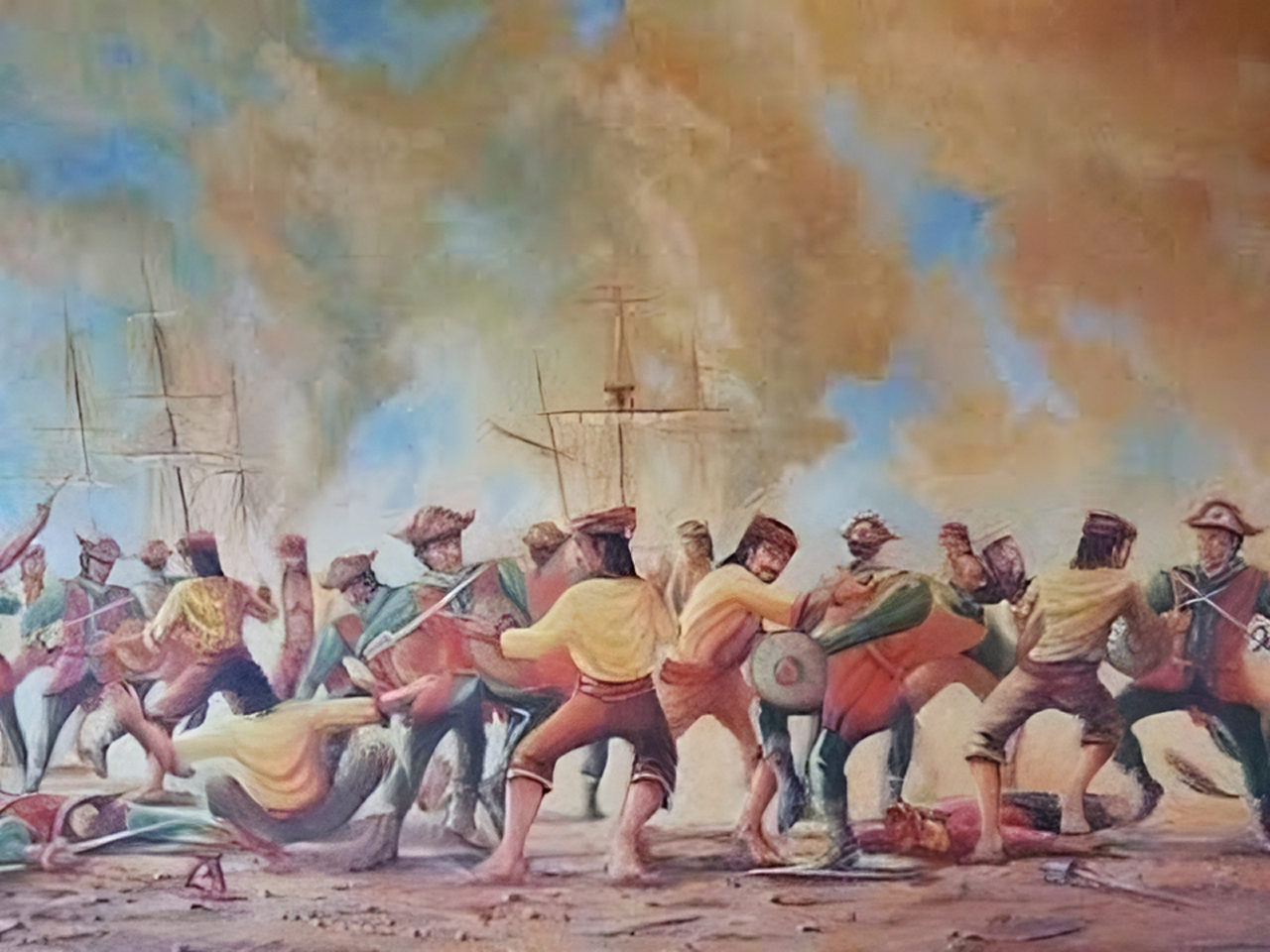
- Bruneian forces fighting Spanish forces
| Date | 16 April – 26 June 1578 |
| Location | Borneo, Mindanao, and Sulu |
| Result | Status quo ante bellum |

Belligerents
| Brunei Sultanate; Sulu Sultanate; Maguindanao Sultanate | Spanish Empire; Captaincy General of the Philippines; Bruneian defectors |

Commanders and leaders
| Sultan Saiful Rijal; Bendahara Sakam; Muhammad ul-Halim; Datu Bangkaya | Francisco de Sande; Pengiran Seri Lela; Pengiran Seri Ratna † |

Units involved
| Bruneian Army | Spanish Army; 200 Spaniards; 200 Mexicans; 1,500 Filipinos; 300 Bruneians |

Strength
| 1,000 men (initial phase); 5,000~ men (late phase); 62 guns; 50 ships | 2,200 men; 40 ships |

Casualties and losses
| Unknown 170 artillery pieces; 27 ships and galleys captured | Unknown; presumably heavy 17 men dead (by dysentery) |

The Castilian War, also called the Spanish expedition to Borneo, was a conflict between the Spanish Empire and several Muslim states in Southeast Asia, including the Sultanates of Brunei, Sulu, and Maguindanao.

== Spanish arrival in the Philippines ==
The Spanish settlements soon began to encroach on the aspirations that Brunei had in the Philippines. The Spanish wanted to Christianize the Muslim-majority regions of the southern Philippines and diminish Bruneian influence. Between 1485 and 1521, Sultan Bolkiah's influence had reached the Manila Bay region, as recorded by the Spaniards.

Despite Bruneian influence, Spanish colonization continued in the archipelago. In 1571, Miguel López launched an expedition from his capital in Cebu to conquer and Christianize the city of Manila, which became the new capital for the Spanish administration. Furthermore, the Visayan peoples of Panay and Cebu (who historically fought against Brunei's allies of Sulu and Maynila) aligned themselves with the Spaniards against Brunei. In 1576, Governor-General Francisco de Sande sent a request to meet with Sultan Saiful Rijal, expressing a desire for good relations with Brunei. However, In 1573, the Governor-General De Sande demanded both permission to proselytize Christianity in the region, and an end to Brunei's proselytizing of Islam. De Sande regarded Brunei as a threat to Spanish presence and religious efforts in the region, stating that "the Moros from Borneo preach the doctrine of Mohammed, converting all the Moros of the islands".

== War ==
Governor-General Francisco de Sande officially declared war against Brunei in 1578, and began preparations for an expedition to Borneo. De Sande assumed the title of Capitán-General and assembled a fleet carrying 200 Spaniards, 200 Mexicans, 1,500 native Filipinos (Luzones), and 300 Borneans. The ethnic composition of the Spanish force was shown to be diverse by later documents that stated the infantry was made up of mestizos, mulattoes, and "Indians" (from Peru and Mexico), led by Spanish officers who had previously fought with native Filipinos in military campaigns across Southeast Asia. The expedition began their journey in March, and the Bruneian campaign was one of several that was undertaken at the time, including action in Mindanao and Sulu.

== Aftermath ==
While the Spanish were unable to immediately subjugate Brunei, they did manage to prevent it from regaining a foothold in Luzon. Relations between the two nations later improved and trade resumed, as evidenced by a 1599 letter from Governor-General Francisco de Tello de Guzmán in which he asked for a return to a normal relationship.

As a result of the conflict, Brunei ceased to be an empire at sea, transforming to a land-based empire, gradually setting aside its policies of territorial expansion and after the developed into a city-state into the late 19th century, surviving to the modern day as the oldest continuously Islamic political entity.

== Sources ==
- Agoncillo, Teodoro A. (1990), History of the Filipino people, R.P. Garcia, ISBN 978-971-8711-06-4
- McAmis, Robert Day (2002), Malay Muslims: the history and challenge of resurgent Islam in Southeast Asia, Wm. B. Eerdmans Publishing, ISBN 978-0-8028-4945-8
- Saunders, Graham E. (2002), A history of Brunei, Routledge, ISBN 978-0-7007-1698-2
- Melo Alip, Eufronio (1964), Political and cultural history of the Philippines, Volumes 1-2
- The Report: Brunei Darussalam 2009, Oxford Business Group, 2009, ISBN 978-1-907065-09-5
- Frankham, Steve (2008), Footprint Borneo, Footprint Guides, ISBN 978-1-906098-14-8
- Atiyah, Jeremy (2002), Rough guide to Southeast Asia, Rough Guide, ISBN 978-1-85828-893-2
