= Abdul Kahar =

Sultan of Brunei (r. 1524–1530)

Abdul Kahar عبد القهار
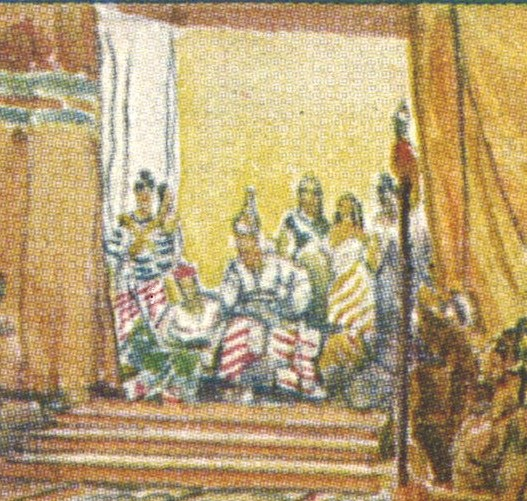

Sultan of Brunei
- Reign: 1524–1530
- Predecessor: Bolkiah
- Successor: Saiful Rijal
- Born: c. 1513
- Died: 1578; Baram River, Sarawak, Bruneian Sultanate (present day Malaysia)
- Spouse: Raja Bajau
- Issue Detail: Raja Sakam
Posthumous name
- Marhum Keramat (مرحوم كرامات)
- Father: Sultan Bolkiah
- Religion: Sunni Islam

Abdul Kahar ibni Bolkiah (c. 1513 – 1578) or posthumously known as Marhum Keramat, was the seventh sultan of Brunei from 1524 until his abdication in 1530. He was reputed to possess supernatural abilities and be a devout man (berkeramat). He abdicated in 1530 to allow his son Saiful Rijal to become Sultan. Additionally, he was known as Siripada by Antonio Pigafetta in 1521.

== Background ==
In 1521, a group of Ferdinand Magellan and Antonio Pigafetta visited Brunei when he was the regent. It was said that he was around 40 years old during Pigafetta's visit. In 1526, a Portuguese named Jorge de Menezes came to Brunei with the aim of doing business as well as seeking support to conquer it. But since Brunei's strength at that time was strong, it was expected that it would be quite difficult to defeat, so the purpose of doing business was to continue. Accordingly, he has successfully made a friendship and trade agreement with then Sultan Bolkiah.

== Reign ==
Sultan Abdul Kahar ascended the throne in 1524, marking the continuation of Brunei's Golden Age throughout his rule. The entirety of Borneo as well as other foreign territories were included in the colonies he inherited from his father. Another Portuguese diplomat by the name of Goncalo Pereira visited Brunei in 1530 in order to examine the country's affairs while conducting commerce, but his enterprise failed to take off and finally vanished. Many Islamic scholars still visit Brunei, though. With the title Paduka Seri Begawan Sultan Abdul Kahar, he abdicated in 1530. The Brunei Times states that he, proceeded to extend Brunei's possessions with naval expeditions, which included the entire Borneo, Palawan, Sulu, Balayan, Mindoro, Bonbon, Balabak, Balambangan and Bangi and Luzon. Pitis was a new form of coinage developed by him. After his death, he was known as Marhum Keramat (Saint), because it's a common belief that his phantom rode a horse.

== Uncertainties ==
The date of Abdul Kahar's death is established through a deposition made by a man named Sisian in Manila in 1579. He recounted being in Brunei when, at the end of June or the beginning of July 1578, Saiful Rijal returned to the capital with his father's body, Abdul Kahar, who had died at sea near the Baram River just days prior. At the time of his death, Abdul Kahar was co-regnant with his son, referred to by the Spaniards as "the Old King" and "the Young King," although the sovereignty rested with the latter. The Spanish Commander addressed Saiful Rijal as "Honoured Soltan Lixar [Rijal], King of Borney."

A significant account from the Boxer Codex, likely written by a Tagalog merchant who had lived in Brunei, described Saiful Rijal as a cheerful and stout man, noting that he was fifty-eight years old in 1589. This information indicates that he was born in 1531, which implies that Abdul Kahar would have been at least eighteen years old at the time of his son's birth, placing his own birth around 1513. Given that there were four sultans from Sharif Ali to Abdul Kahar, a direct father-to-son succession within the timeframe of 1514/15 to 1531 becomes genetically implausible. Therefore, if these dates are accurate, it suggests there must have been a succession of brothers at some point in the royal lineage.

== Personal life ==
Sultan Abdul Kahar had the following issue:

- Pengiran Muda Besar Ismail.
- Pengiran Muda Tengah Othman.
- Pengiran Muda Iring Aliakbar.
- Raja Sakam, later Pengiran Bendahara

== See also ==
- List of sultans of Brunei

Regnal titles
| Preceded by Bolkiah | Sultan of Brunei; 1524–1530 | Succeeded by Saiful Rijal |
