= Limbongan, Brunei =

Former village in Brunei

Kampong Limbongan Kampung Limbongan
- Village
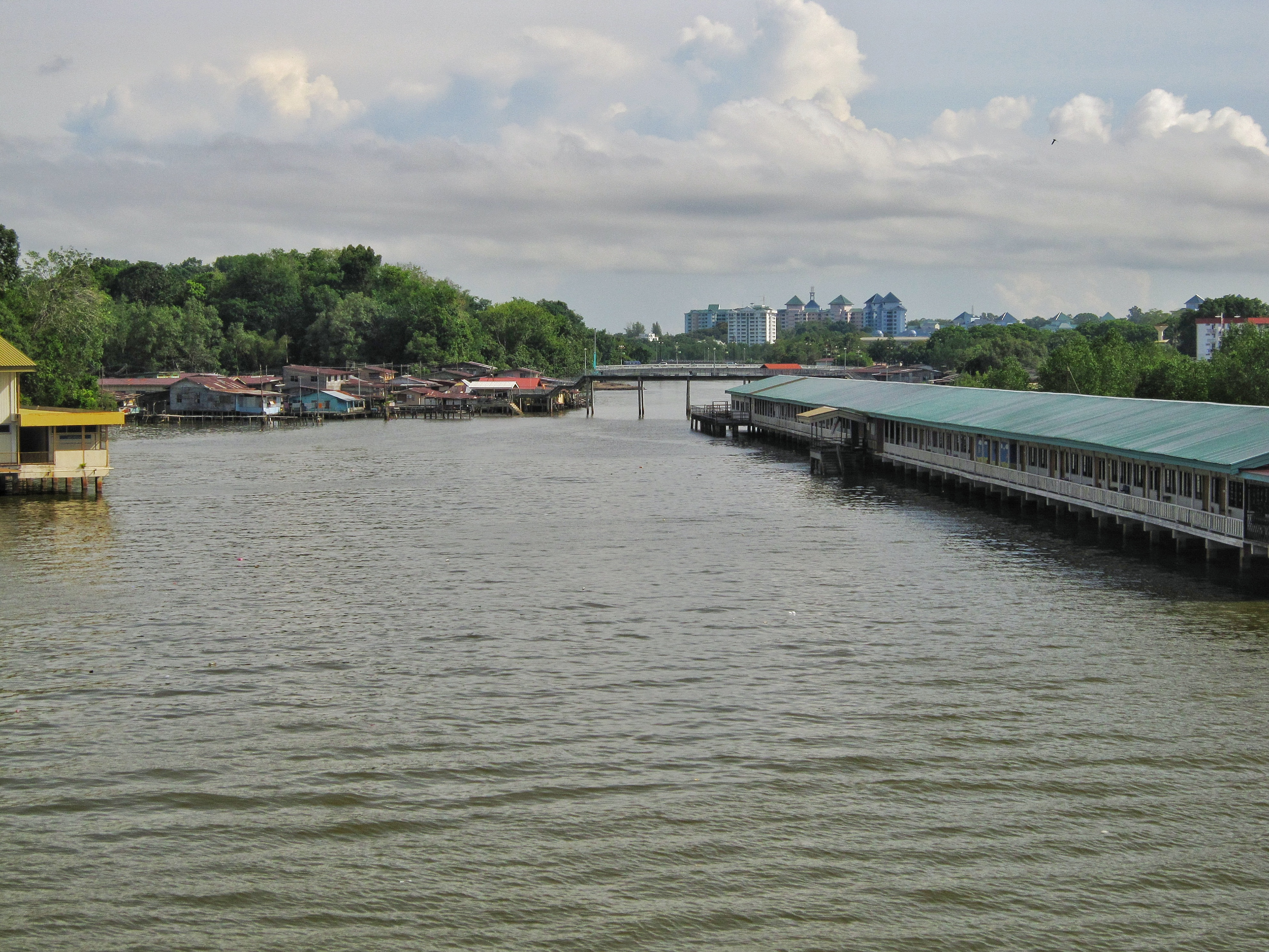
- Kampong Limbongan (left) and Kampong Sungai Kedayan 'A' (right) in 2011

- Location in Brunei
- Coordinates: 4°53′16″N 114°56′09″E
- Country: Brunei
- District: Brunei-Muara
- Mukim: Tamoi
- Ceased to exist: 2010s
- Postcode: BL1312

Limbongan was a neighbourhood in Kampong Ayer, the riverine stilt settlement in Bandar Seri Begawan, the capital of Brunei. It was officially a village subdivision under Tamoi, a mukim (subdistrict) of Brunei-Muara District, and had the postcode BL1312. Limbongan was one of the traditional stilt neighbourhoods which had existed along the banks of the Kedayan River, a tributary of the Brunei River in the vicinity of Kampong Ayer, before they were eventually demolished in the 2010s and redeveloped into Taman Mahkota Jubli Emas, a riverfront park.

== Etymology ==
"Limbongan" is the former spelling of the Malay word "limbungan" which literally means 'dockyard'.

== History ==
Kampong Limbongan served as a trading base for pengalu from Kampong Tamoi, Lorong Dalam, Burong Pinggai, and Bukit Salat. From this base, they conducted trade in areas including Kampong Batu Empat, Kilanas, Mulaut, Junjungan, and Limau Manis. These traders utilised large perahu or sampan equipped with walls and roof awnings for protection, often operated with the help of their family members.

== Places of interest ==
Kampong Limbongan is notable for having a headstone dated 848 Hijrah (corresponding to AD 1444), indicating its historical significance. This, along with other early Islamic gravestones in the region, such as those in Kota Batu and Luba, supports evidence of Brunei's Islamic heritage dating back to the 13th century.
