= Shah Brunei =

Sultan of Brunei (r. 1581–1582)

Shah Brunei شاه بروناي

Sultan of Brunei
- Reign: 1581–1582
- Predecessor: Saiful Rijal
- Successor: Muhammad Hasan
- Died: c. 1582
- Burial: Kianggeh Muslim Cemetery, Kianggeh, Bandar Seri Begawan, Brunei
- House: Bolkiah
- Father: Saiful Rijal
- Religion: Sunni Islam

Shah Brunei ibni Saiful Rijal (died c. 1582) was the Sultan of Brunei from 1581 until 1582, the year he is alleged to have died.

Pengiran Muda Besar Shah Berunai ascended the throne in 1581 on the death of his father, Sultan Saiful Rijal. A Flemish trader of precious stones named Jacques de Coutre described him as "more a pirate than a king" and most of his followers as "Borneo Bajaus."

He died in 1582 without any male descendants and was succeeded by his younger brother, Pengiran Muda Tengah Muhammad Hassan. He was noted to be buried in Kianggeh.

== Uncertainties ==
The Boxer Codex indicates that in 1589, the heir apparent was Saiful Rijal's eldest son, Raja Borney. According to Hugh Low, Shah Brunei died without leaving any children, although he notes in a footnote that some accounts claim the sultan abdicated in favour of his brother. The Silsilah states that Shah Brunei was succeeded by his brother, Muhammad Hasan. However, the circumstances surrounding Shah Brunei's succession are more complicated.

On 26 December 1600, Olivier van Noort arrived in Brunei Bay and was informed by local officials that the king was under the guardianship of his uncle, who served as regent. This suggests the existence of an infant son of Shah Brunei, possibly Raja Ghafur, who was mentioned by Manuel Godinho de Erédia as the ruler of Brunei in 1600, although he does not appear in any version of the Silsilah. If Muhammad Hasan acted as regent for his nephew, he could not have been the ninth sultan. Consequently, the absence of any mention of the infant in either version of the Silsilah suggests that he likely died shortly afterward, enabling Muhammad Hasan to ascend to the throne sometime in 1601.

== See also ==
- List of sultans of Brunei

Regnal titles
Preceded by Saiful Rijal	Sultan of Brunei; 1581–1582	Succeeded by Muhammad Hasan
