= Kianggeh Muslim Cemetery =

Cemetery and royal mausoleum in Brunei

Kianggeh Dagang Muslim Cemetery
- Tanah Perkuburan Islam Dagang Kianggeh
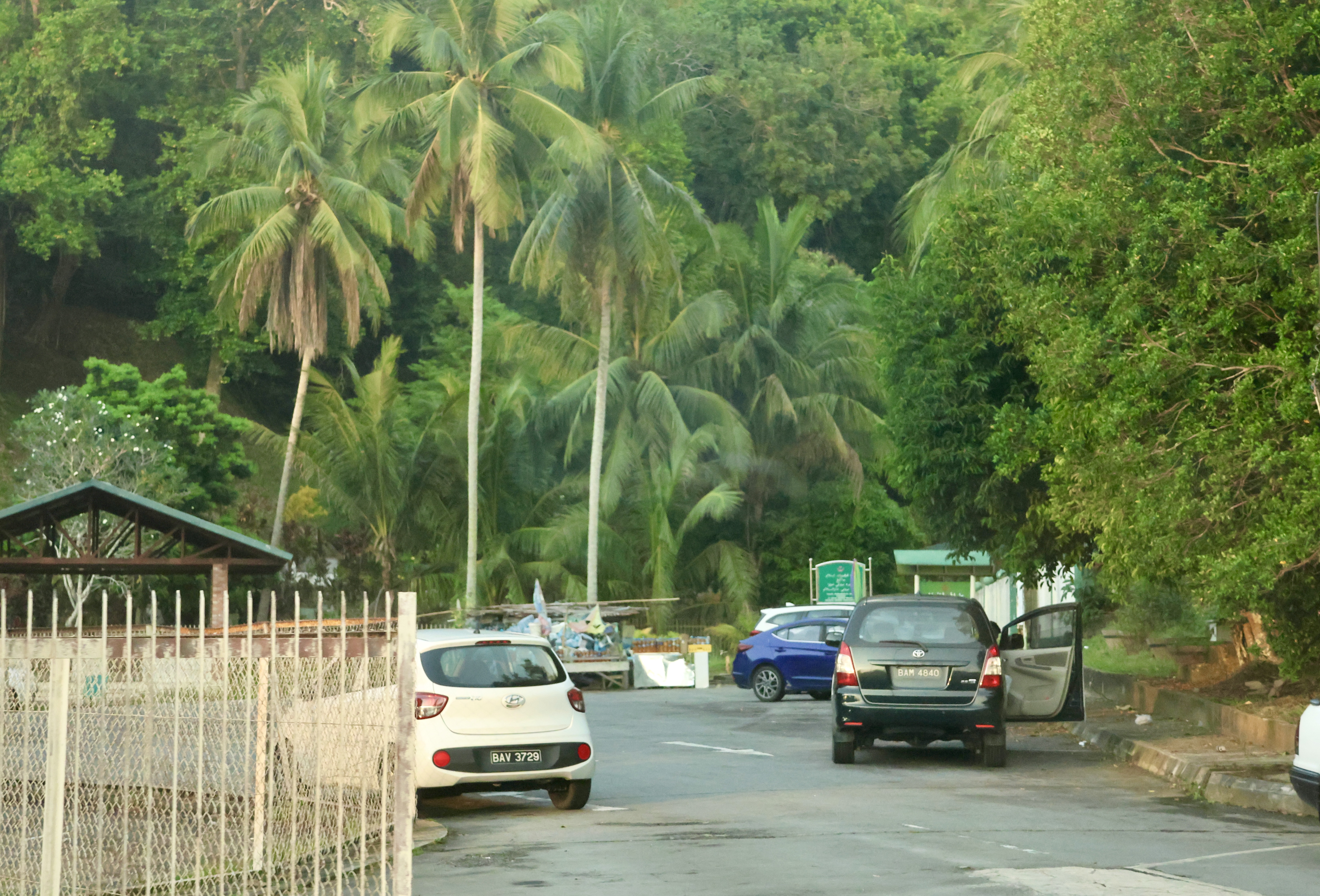
- The cemetery seen from Jalan Residency
- Interactive map of Kianggeh Dagang Muslim Cemetery

Details
- Location: Bandar Seri Begawan, Brunei-Muara
- Country: Brunei
- Coordinates: 4.8878735°N 114.9460492°E
- Type: Public cemetery, formerly a Royal mausoleum

The Kianggeh Dagang Muslim Cemetery (Malay: Tanah Perkuburan Islam Kianggeh Dagang), simply known as Kianggeh Muslim Cemetery, is a Muslim burial ground located at Kianggeh in Bandar Seri Begawan, the capital of Brunei Darussalam. The cemetery was formerly a Royal burial ground which known as Bukit Tinggi Royal Mausoleum which served as resting place for past Sultans of Brunei. The first Sultan of Brunei buried here was Sultan Saiful Rijal, the 7th Sultan of Brunei who died in 1581.

== List of graves ==
=== Sultan of Brunei's graves ===
- Saiful Rijal (died 1581), 7th Sultan of Brunei
- Shah Berunai (died 1582), 8th Sultan of Brunei
- Muhammad Ali (died 1661), 12th Sultan of Brunei
- Muhyiddin (died 1690), 14th Sultan of Brunei
- Nasruddin (died 1710), 15th Sultan of Brunei

=== Royal graves (members of the royal family) ===
- Pengiran Temenggong Abdul Rauf
- Paduka Raja Bendahara Sri Indera Maharaja Pengiran Muda Muhammad Alam (died c.1710)
- Pengiran Indera Mahkota (died 1858)
- Pengiran Abu Bakar Umar (died 11 June 1985)
- Pengiran Lela Perkasa Pengiran Haji Mohammad Said bin Pengiran Jaya Negara Pengiran Haji Abu Bakar (died 20 January 1998)
- Datin Hajah Suraya Harun (died 1 June 2016), Malaysian veteran actress.
- Pengiran Umar Apong (died 12 May 2023)

=== Non-royal graves ===
- Sheikh Mahmud bin Sheikh Abdul Hamid Al Idrus (died 5 February 1961)
- Ibrahim Mohammad Jahfar (died 19 February 1971)
- Matnor McAfee (died 15 February 1973)
- Pehin Datu Indera Sugara Dato Seri Laila Jasa Haji Johari bin Haji Abdul Razak (died 11 October 1977)
- Pehin Manteri Bini Datin Seri Laila Jasa Dayang Hajah Mariam binti Ahmad (died 3 July 1978)
- Haji Abdul Aziz bin Abdullah (died 2 December 1979), father to Mariam and Jaafar.
- Pengiran Hajah Rashidah binti Pengiran Mohd Salleh (died 11 March 1984), mother to Mariam and Jaafar.
- Salleh Masri (died 14 December 1997)
- Abbas Al-Sufri (died 8 March 2014)
- Shahril Anwar Ma'awiah (died 19 November 2021)
