= Kianggeh River =

River in Brunei

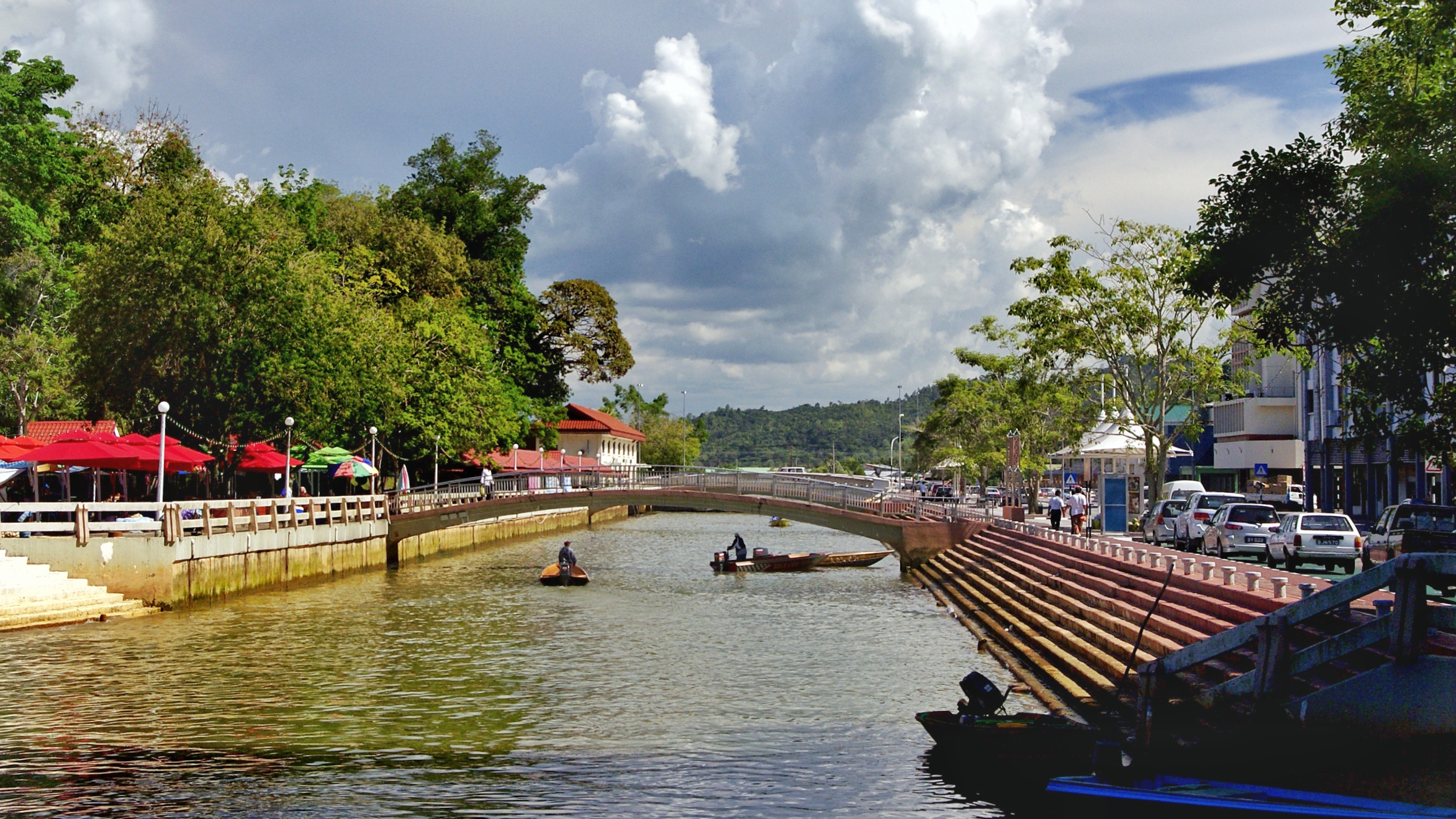
- Fishing boats on the Kianggeh River in 2009

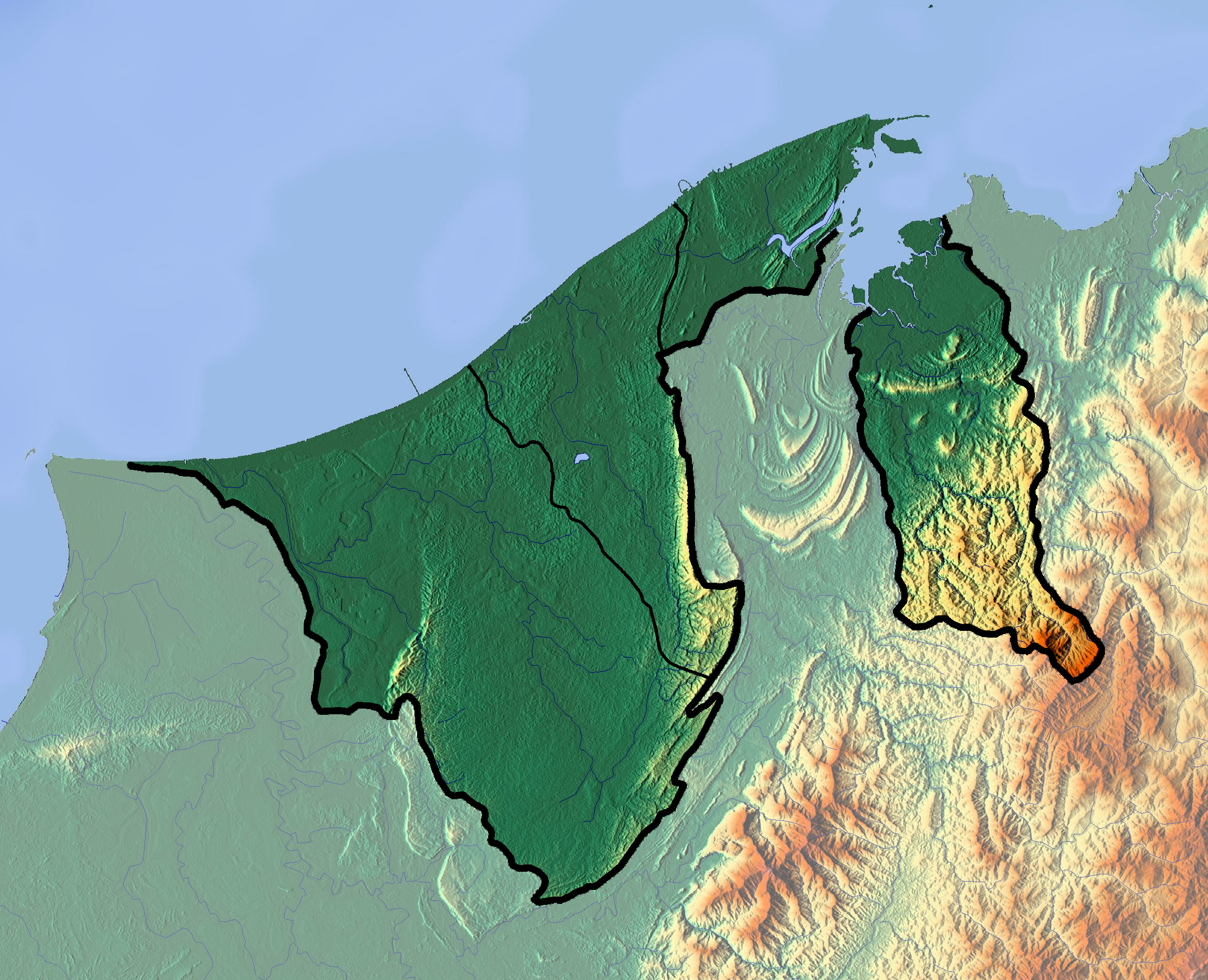
- Location of the mouth of the Kianggeh
- Etymology: Kiang
- Native name: Sungai Kianggeh (Malay)

Location
- Country: Brunei
- District: Brunei–Muara

Physical characteristics
- Source
  - location: Tasek Reservoir and Subok Hill
- Mouth: Brunei River
  - location: Bandar Seri Begawan
  - coordinates: 4°53′12″N 114°56′41″E

Basin features
- River system: Brunei River

The Kianggeh River (Malay: Sungai Kianggeh) is a small tributary of the Brunei that flows through Bandar Seri Begawan, the capital of Brunei.

== Etymology ==
The name Kianggeh may have been derived from the Chinese term kiang, which means river, according to a book Dokumentasi. Although it is also conceivable that the name Kianggeh was derived from the name of a person, nothing has been documented about this as of yet.

== Geography ==
The Kianggeh River is a significant small river located on the eastern border of Pusat Bandar, near Kampong Ayer, and is accessible by boat from a nearby pier. It serves as a vital connection point for the people of Kampong Ayer and functions as a jetty between the Brunei–Muara District and Temburong District, particularly since around 1996. Situated just a ten-minute walk from the Omar Ali Saifuddien Mosque, the river connects to the bustling Kianggeh Market area, and nearby lies the Kianggeh Muslim Cemetery. Another noteworthy spot in the Sungai Kianggeh area is a big, high gravestone that stands atop a little hill with a view of the river.

== History ==
An emergency plan to pump 500,000 gallons of water per day from Kianggeh River into the Tasek Lama reservoir was put in place in 1968 to alleviate water shortages. This plan significantly helped during a time of high demand, particularly during the coronation of Sultan Hassanal Bolkiah. These short-term solutions, while beneficial, were not intended to take the place of a permanent supply line that was scheduled to run from river to the Tasek Lama reservoir. Due to a shortage of departmental design professionals, the 90 foot (27 m)-long Sungai Kianggeh Bridge in Brunei Town (now Bandar Seri Begawan) was designed and built by a consulting engineering firm the same year, at a cost of $330,000.

In 1976, further improvements were made with the completion of reinforced concrete slopes and protective slabs along Kianggeh River, costing $65,798. A 1977 report highlighted additional measures taken to ensure water supply during emergencies, including the deployment of a fire boat to the Kianggeh River. This vessel used river water to augment the primary water source for fighting fires. The report also noted the completion of a $51,134 project that involved constructing brick flower boxes and protective concrete slabs along the river in Bandar Seri Begawan.

By around 1986, Sungai Kianggeh became increasingly busy, evolving into a hub for small powered boats, particularly for part-time boat owners from Kampong Saba. These operators often concentrated their activities at the Kianggeh River base, which also served as a stopping point for vendors selling daily necessities. The area became a vibrant marketplace where vendors engaged in barter trading, exchanging goods with one another. Market sellers coexist alongside modest handicraft and clothing shops along the rushing brown river, with some of these businesses employing illegal Thai seamstresses laid off from the nation's textile industries to increase output.

== Residency Bridge ==
The Residency Bridge was built around 1900 and underwent restoration in 1990. It is located along the main route connecting Jalan Residency with Jalan Kianggeh and the surrounding villages in Kota Batu. The bridge is constructed entirely from concrete. Originally, it was built by the British Resident in Brunei to facilitate transportation, as British officials at the time resided in Subok and administered the Brunei Town area. In 1990, the bridge was refurbished, and a new bridge was constructed beside it to improve traffic flow, turning the route into a two-way road.

== Gallery ==
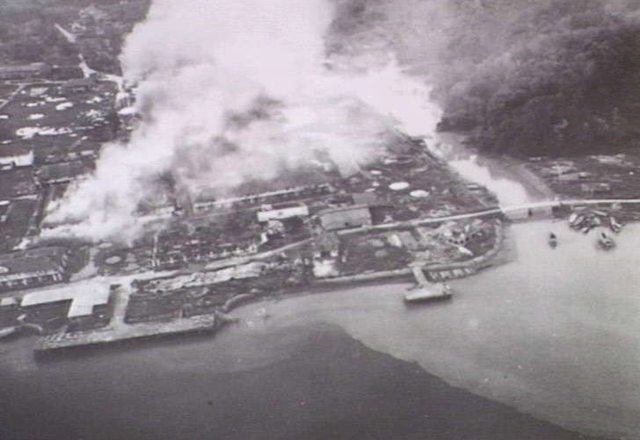
Brunei Town and Kianggeh River seen during Allied bombings in 1945

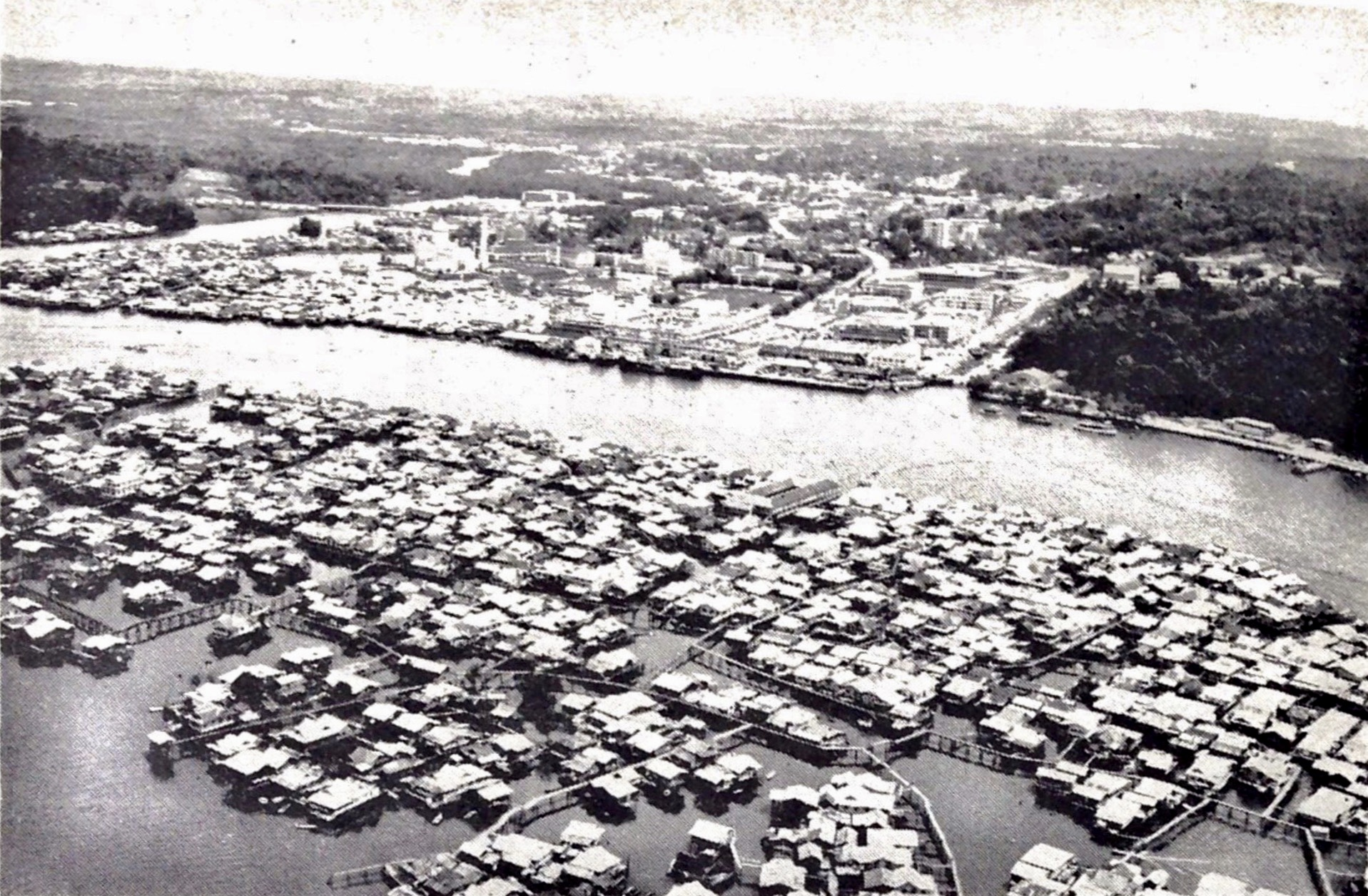
Aerial view of Pusat Bandar (center) and Kampong Ayer (foreground), with the view of Kianggeh River (right) in the 1960s

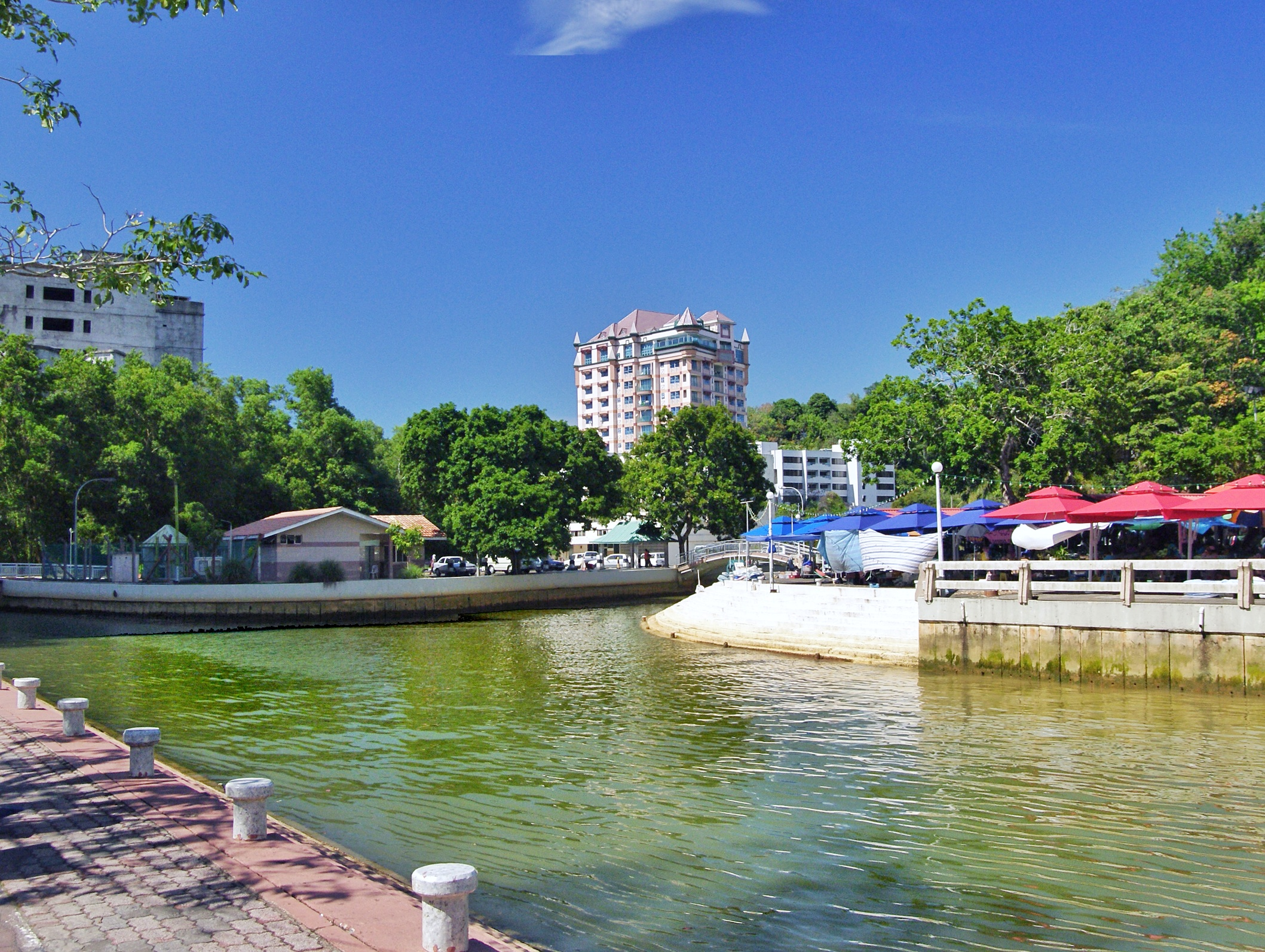
View of the Kianggeh Market (right) along the Kianggeh River in 2009

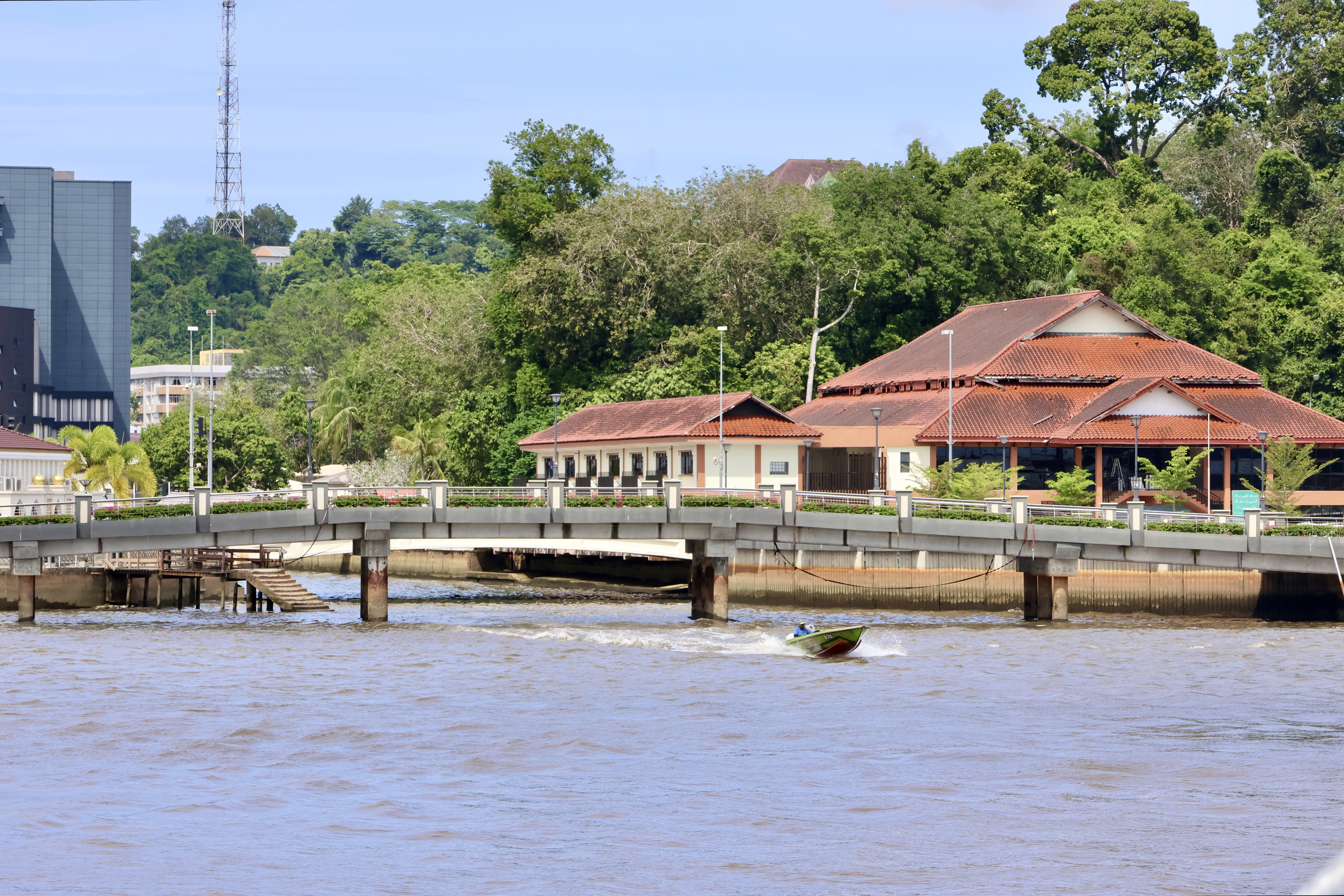
The mouth of the Kianggeh River underneath the Residency Bridge in 2023

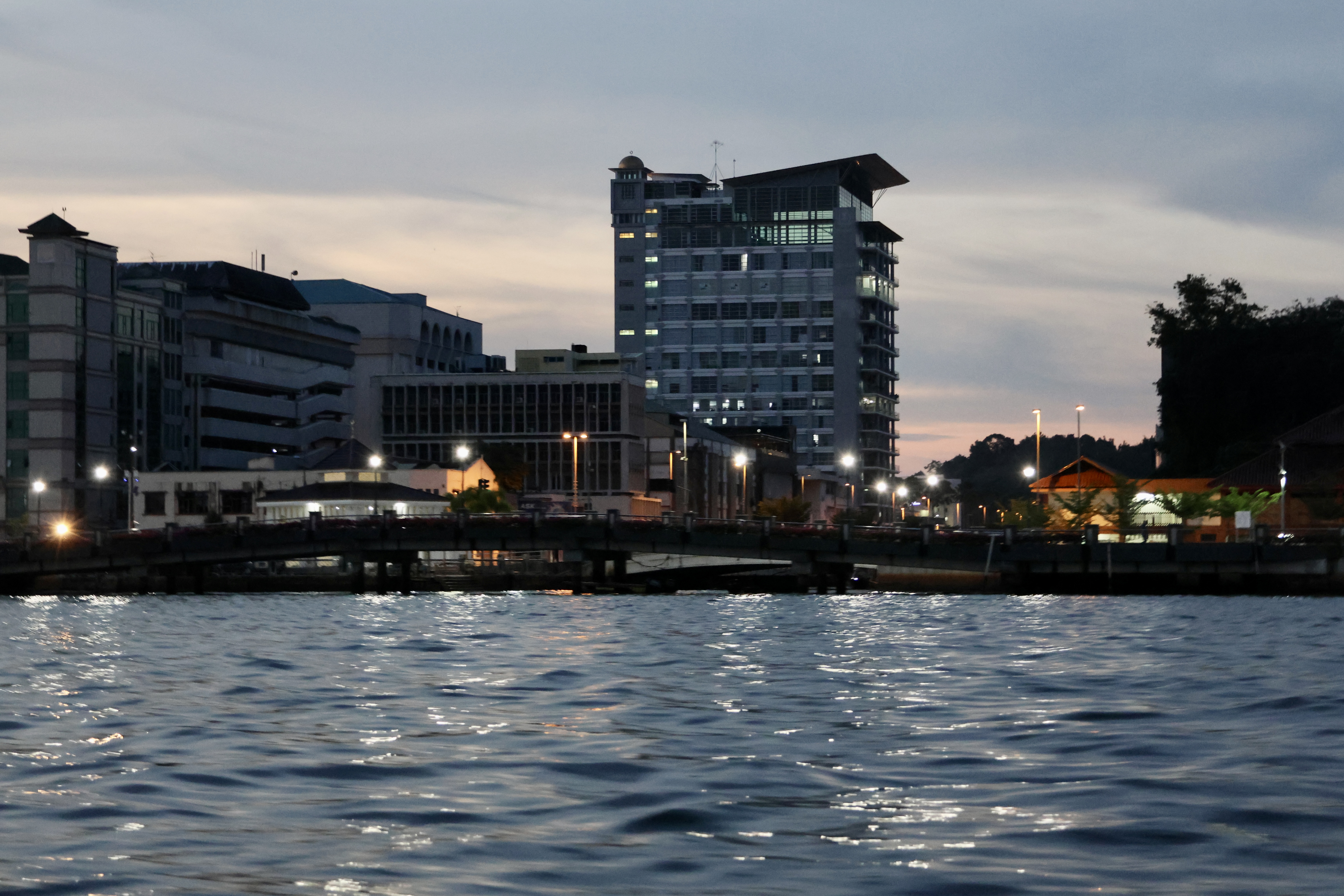
The mouth of Kianggeh River at dusk in 2023
