= Kampong Kianggeh =

Neighbourhood in Bandar Seri Begawan, Brunei

Kampong Kianggeh Kampung Kianggeh
- Neighbourhood and village
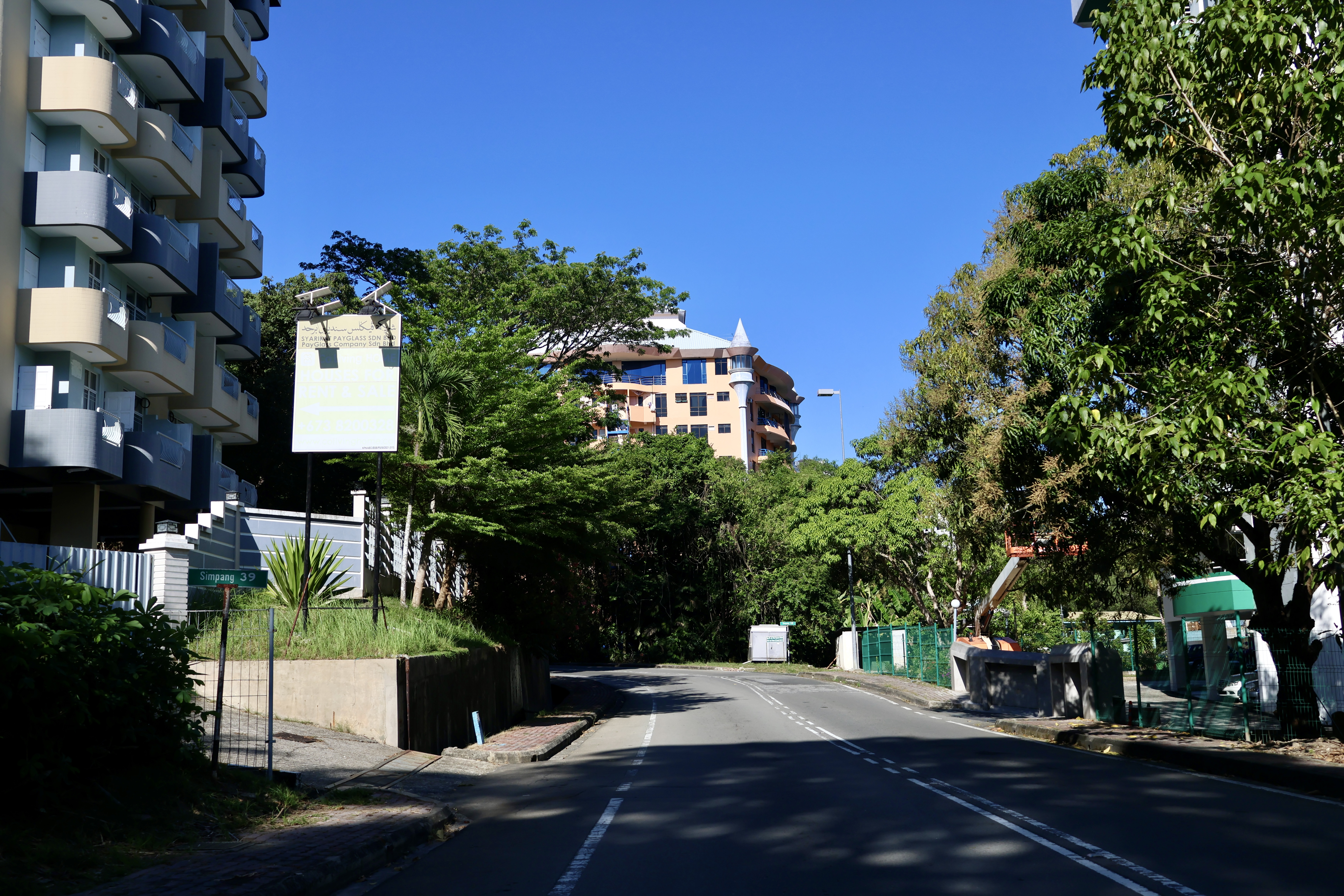
- Jalan Kampong Kianggeh

- Location in Brunei
- Coordinates: 4°53′28″N 114°56′49″E
- Country: Brunei
- District: Brunei-Muara
- Mukim: Kianggeh

Government
  - Village head: Lawi Lamat

Population (2016)
  - Total: 1,421
- Time zone: UTC+8 (BNT)
- Postcode: BA1211

Kampong Kianggeh is a neighbourhood in Bandar Seri Begawan, the capital of Brunei. It is also a village in Brunei-Muara District, within Mukim Kianggeh. The population was 1,421 in 2016.

== Etymology ==
The name Kianggeh may have been derived from the Chinese term kiang, which means river, according to a book Dokumentasi. Although it is also conceivable that the name Kianggeh was derived from the name of a person, nothing has been documented about this as of yet.

== History ==
One of the three locations chosen for the resettlement of Kampong Ayer people to land under a government initiative was Kampong Kianggeh, previously Kampong Sungai Tekuyong. In order to promote involvement, the government encouraged settlers to cultivate fruit and coconut trees and provided freehold land titles, allowing common people to possess property for the first time. Although the Kampong Ayer community first opposed the migration, certain people—mainly Chinese residents and members of the royal pengiran class—embraced it because they saw the long-term advantages of living on land. The first contestants in 1909 were mostly members of Brunei's royal family.

== Places of interest ==
=== Kianggeh Market ===
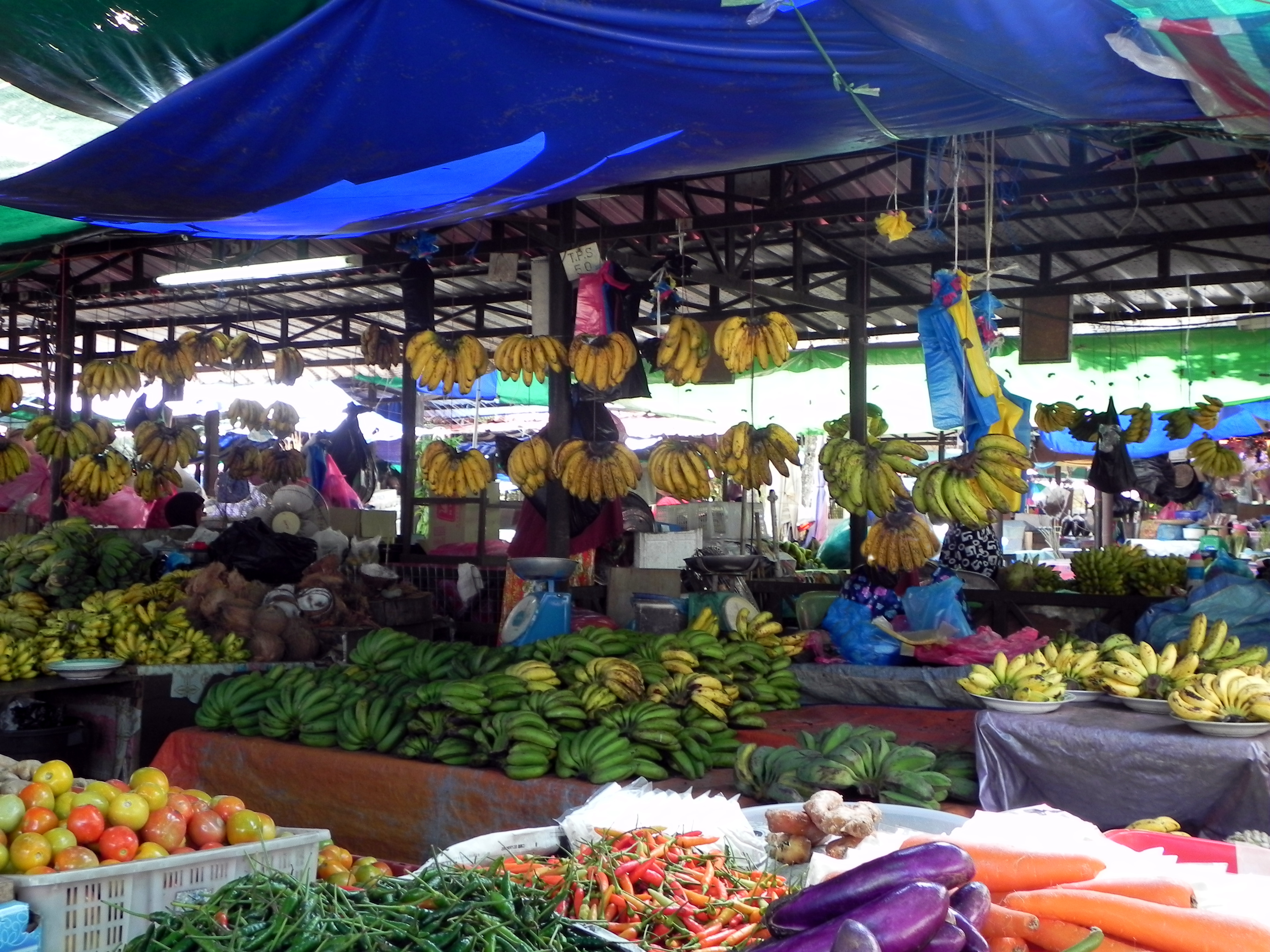
Kianggeh Market in 2010

Kianggeh Market (Tamu Kianggeh) is a tamu or local traditional market in Kampong Kianggeh, situated on the banks of Kianggeh River. The market mainly sells produce, fish, meat and local foods. It has existed since the 1960s; it is believed to be the oldest market in the country. Kianggeh Market is regarded as a tourist attraction in Brunei. It was visited by Queen Elizabeth II during her state visit to Brunei in 1998. It was also visited by the British chef Antony Worrall Thompson and featured in his TV travel documentary Antony Worrall Thompson: Adventures in Brunei which was aired in Discovery TLC in 2011.

The current market complex was built in 2016; it has a total area of 4,450 square metres (47,900 sq ft), comprises eight buildings and altogether accommodates 313 stalls. The new complex was built as a modern and more organised replacement to the previous facilities. It was reported that the market was originally planned to be relocated to Gadong but scrapped after receiving opposition from the local vendors.

=== Tugu PGGMB ===
The Tugu PGGMB, built in 1960, is located near the dining stalls along the Brunei River and Kianggeh River, at Jalan Residency in Bandar Seri Begawan. Constructed using concrete and tiles, the monument was inspired by the Brunei Malay Teachers Association (PGGMB), one of the oldest and most active associations in the country. The association plays a significant role in trade matters and has a strong presence in the nation. This monument symbolises an organization dedicated to promoting education and the dissemination of knowledge to the people of Brunei.

== Notable people ==
- Umar Apong (1940–2023), police officer and nobleman
- Salleh Masri (1919–1997), politician and activist
- Mokhtar Puteh (1929–2016), politician and nobleman
- Said Abdullah (1921–2011), penghulu and nobleman
