= Kedayan River =

River in Brunei

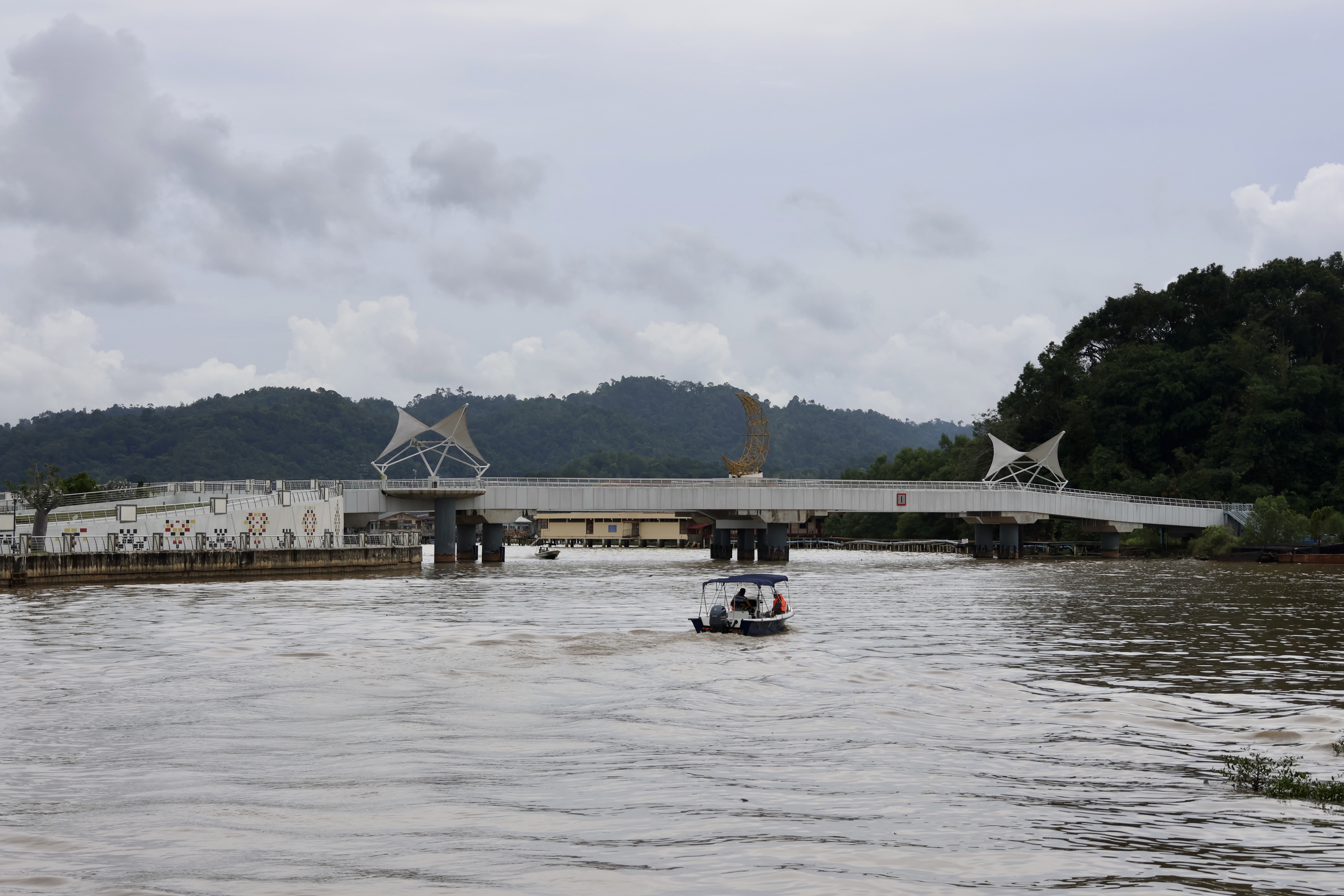
- Mouth of the river over Sultan Omar Ali Saifuddien Pedestrian Bridge

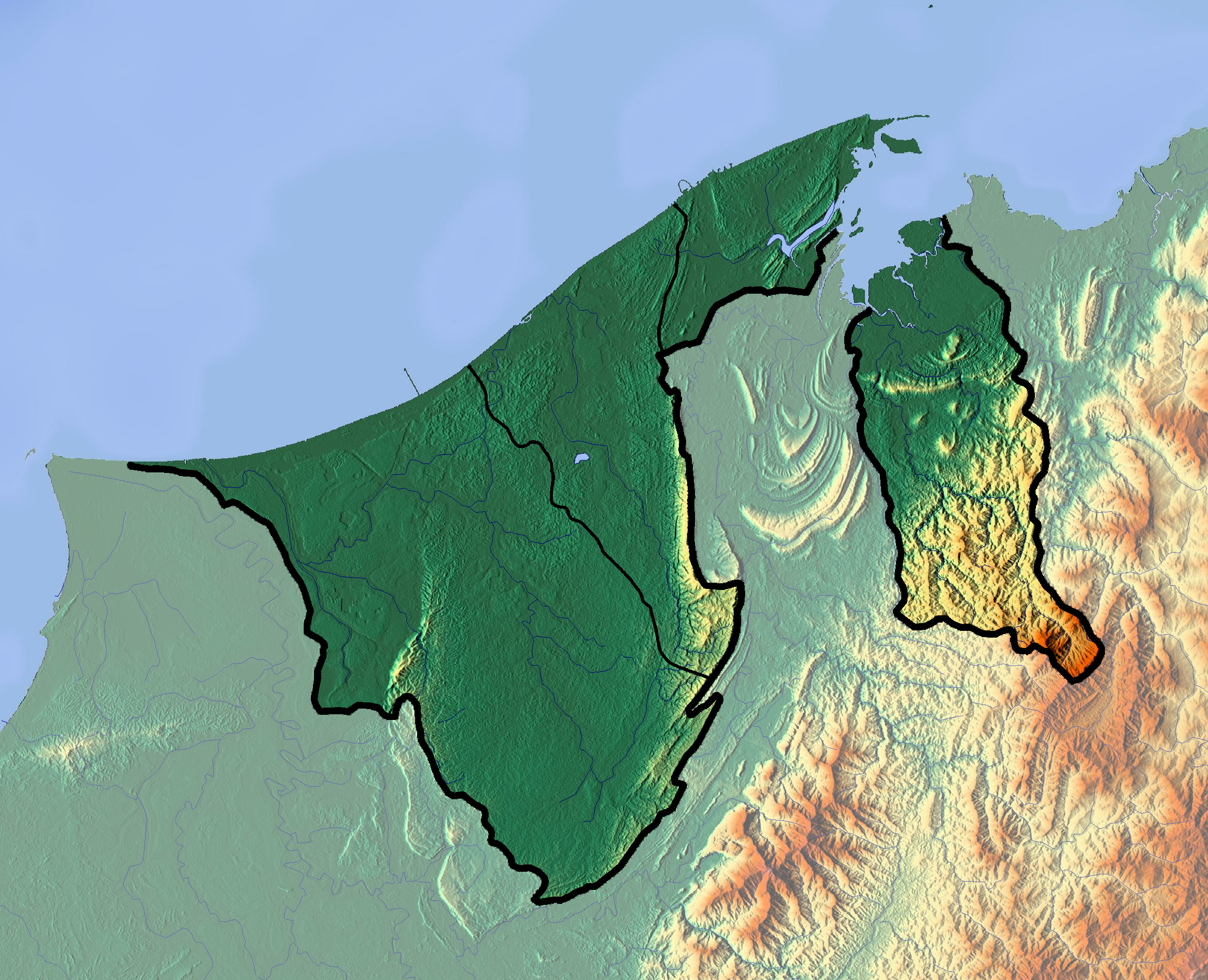
- Location of the mouth of the Kedayan River
- Native name: Sungai Kedayan (Malay)

Location
- Country: Brunei
- District: Brunei-Muara
- Mukim: Sungai Kedayan

Physical characteristics
- Mouth: Brunei River
  - location: Bandar Seri Begawan, Brunei-Muara, Brunei
  - coordinates: 4°53′12″N 114°56′14″E

Basin features
- River system: Brunei River

Kedayan River (Malay: Sungai Kedayan) is a tributary of the Brunei River which flows through the capital of Brunei, Bandar Seri Begawan.

== Sites ==
On 22 October 2017, the Taman Mahkota Jubli Emas public park was officially opened. It was part of the Sungai Kedayan Eco-Corridor Project which aims to redevelop the area. The consequence of this project caused Kampong Sungai Kedayan, one of the oldest village in the area, to be demolished.

Constructed in 1959, Edinburgh Bridge is a two-lane bridge that crosses the Kedayan River and links the city centre with the rest of Bandar Seri Begawan, Brunei's capital. It became one of Brunei's first bridges, replacing the previous Clifford Bridge and greatly improving urban development and connection. It is now a prominent landmark in the capital as a result.

== See also ==
- List of rivers of Brunei
