= Abdul Momin =

Sultan of Brunei from 1852 to 1885

Abdul Momin عبد المؤمن
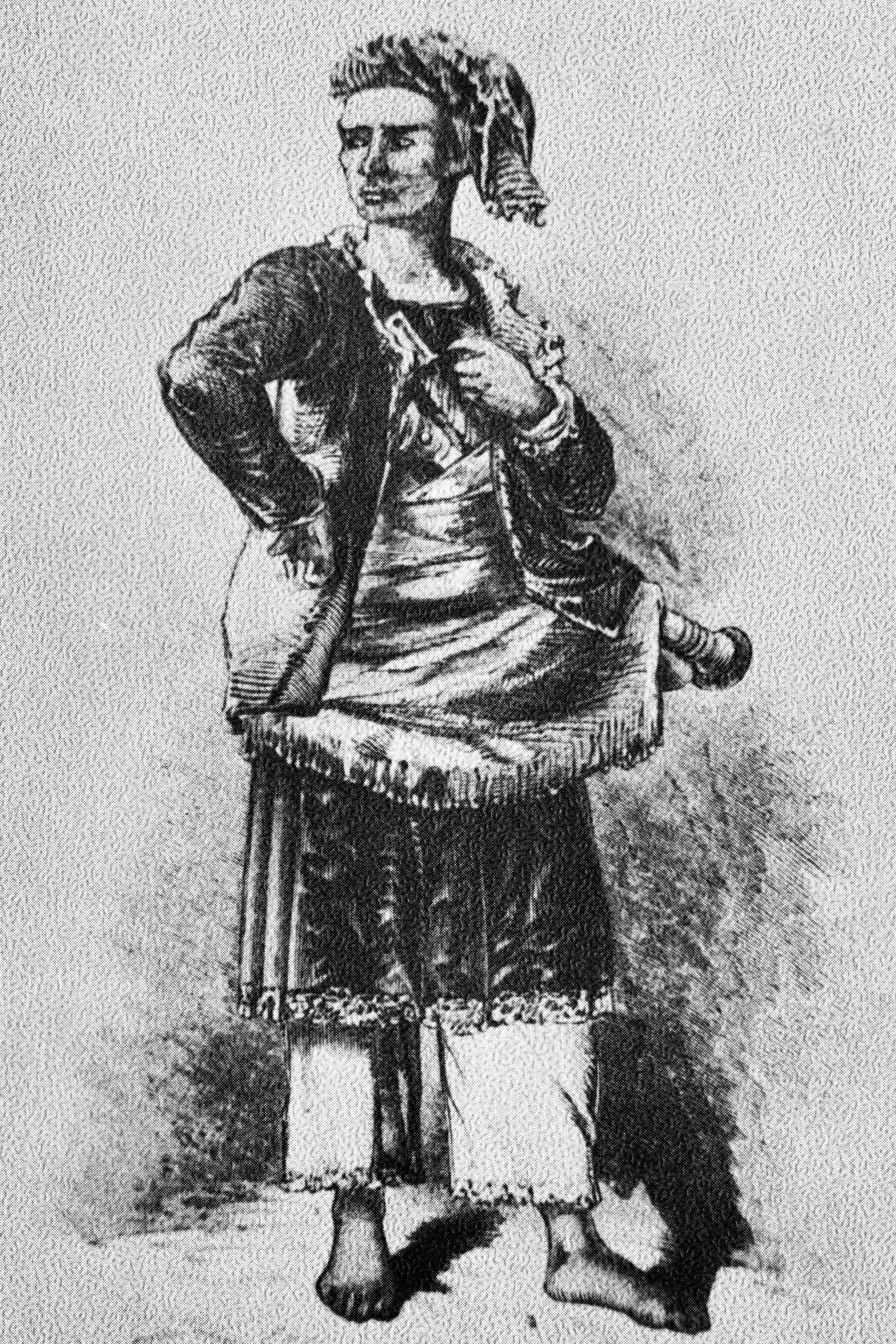
- Illustration of Abdul Momin

Sultan of Brunei
- Reign: 1852–1885
- Predecessor: Omar Ali Saifuddin II
- Successor: Hashim Jalilul Alam Aqamaddin
- Born: 1788
- Died: 29 May 1885 (aged 97)
- Burial: Royal Mausoleum, Bandar Seri Begawan, Brunei (Note: The authenticity of his tomb is supported by oral history from his descendants, despite lacking inscriptions.)
- Spouse: Pengiran Anak Zubaidah
- Issue: Pengiran Anak Shahabuddin; Pengiran Anak Besar Muhammad; Pengiran Anak Tengah Muhammad Hasan
- House: Bolkiah
- Father: Pengiran Anak Abdul Wahab
- Religion: Islam

Abdul Momin ibni Abdul Wahab (1788–29 May 1885) was the 24th Sultan of Brunei from 1852 until his death in 1885. Abdul Momin sought British support as he blocked Charles Brooke's attempts to acquire more Bruneian land in 1868. In 1877, Baron von Overbeck secured Sabah’s concession of land from Abdul Momin for an annual payment. Brooke's manipulative tactics ultimately led to British restrictions on his land acquisitions while Overbeck gained control over northern Borneo.

Despite initial resistance from Brooke's land expansion, Abdul Momin was forced to negotiate, Brooke eventually obtained land from Kidurong Bay to Baram in 1882, providing an annual payment for the latter. Facing continued losses, Abdul Momin restructured Brunei’s government and eliminated certain taxes in 1884. In 1885, he issued the Amanat, prohibiting further land concessions to foreigners, but it lacked enforcement power. Shortly after, Brunei lost Trusan, exposing the Amanat’s weakness. The British, uninterested in investing in Brunei, allowed Brooke and the British North Borneo Company to dominate, accelerating Brunei’s decline. His efforts ultimately failed, and he died in the same year.

== Early life ==
Prior to taking the throne, he was born Pengiran Anak Abdul Momin, son of Pengiran Shahbandar Maulana Pengiran Anak Abdul Wahab ibni Al-Marhum Sultan Omar Ali Saifuddin I. He was a son-in-law of his first cousin once removed, Sultan Omar Ali Saifuddin II, due to his marriage to Pengiran Anak Zubaidah, who became his Raja Isteri (Queen Consort). Acknowledged for his sway over the royal family and populace, he worked as Omar Ali Saifuddin II's advisor during his lifetime before ascending to the throne in 1852. Sultan Hashim Jalilul Alam Aqamaddin was his brother-in-law.

== Reign ==
=== Accession and territorial decline ===
Abdul Momin succeeded his first cousin once removed and father-in-law Omar 'Ali Saifuddin II as sultan upon the latter's death in 1852, having previously served as regent for him during his ill health. However, Abdul Momin was not the first choice for the Throne. The Brunei Royal Council first offered the Throne to Pengiran Anak Muhammad Tajuddin ibnu Sultan Muhammad Jamalul Alam I because it was felt generally that he was the best qualified to be the next Sultan. However, Tajuddin turned it down due to his age.

During his reign, many territories were surrendered to James Brooke of Sarawak (White Rajahs). Upon Abdul Momin's accession to the Throne, James Brooke not only force Abdul Momin to confirm his position as an independent Raja, but also force the Sultan to cede the Batang Lupar area. In 1855, James Brooke force Abdul Momin to give up seven districts stretching from Samarahan to Rajang. On 26 November 1856, the British signed a treaty with Sultan Abdul Momin to reconfirm the Treaty of Friendship and Commerce signed in 1847. In 1861, Brooke backed by the British government, visited Brunei to discuss the annexation of Mukah with the Sultan.

In 1865, Charles Lee Moses, an American Consul General, signed an agreement with Abdul Momin and obtained twenty one districts. The 1847 Treaty was breached although no protests were made from the Sultan.

=== Charles Brooke and Brunei land dispute ===
Charles Brooke tried to persuade Abdul Momin to cede Brunei's territory from Kidurong Bay to the Baram River at the beginning of 1868, but the Sultan declined and went to the Governor of Labuan, John Pope Hennessy, for support. In support of Brunei, the Governor claimed that Brunei was entitled to British protection under the terms of the 1847 Brunei–British Friendship and Trade Treaty. The Governor also offered to arbitrate a dispute between Brunei and Brooke, an offer that Brooke turned down. Brooke thought the land dispute was insignificant and that two sovereign countries could settle their differences without the help of a third party; he later protested to the British Foreign Office, charging the Sultan of deceit and having secret plans.

In an attempt to forward his own goal, Brooke purposefully stopped paying the Sultan cession money for lands he had already given up. When this incident was brought to the attention of the British Foreign Department in April 1868 by Governor Pope-Hennessy, Brooke fined Abdul Momin $4,000 for defamation. Although Brooke saw royal insignia as a show of respect, he stated that the Sultan's letters were often marked with them. When he later got letters missing of these insignia, he perceived this as a deliberate insult. This strategy not only forced the Sultan to comply with the terms of the lost territory but also exposed Brooke's plot to evade the yearly cession payments. Brooke's action caused the British government to ban Charles from gaining any territories for the next ten years. That same year, the Sultan introduced a new type of tin Pitis coinage, also known as the umbrella coins.

In his articles for the Sarawak Gazette and Brooke Journal, Brooke frequently showed rivalry and painted the Sultanate in an unfavourable light, emphasising the poverty that Bruneians faced, according to a report by Henry Ernest Gascoyne Bulwer, the Consular-General in Borneo. This was his first ruse to take control of more territory in Brunei as a colonist. To depict Abdul Momin and his aristocracy as unfit to lead, Brooke deliberately highlighted Bruneian poverty while also quietly hinting that the Sultan need to seize control of Brunei's lands.

In the 1870s, Brooke traveled to Brunei Town to negotiate trading rights for Sarawak traders within Brunei's borders with Abdul Momin and the nobility. The traders had complained to Brooke about trade barriers imposed by the Bruneian government, hindering their business. During that period, Brunei's territory included three rivers – Kerajaan, Kuripan, and Tulin – controlled by the Sultan and designated nobles. The Sultan directly controlled the Kerajaan River, while the Kuripan River was awarded to viziers by the Sultan and did not pass through inheritance.

The ownership of Brunei territories was structured around distinct rivers: the Kerajaan and Kuripan Rivers were owned by sultans and viziers, while the Tulin River lands belonged to the royal family (Sultan, viziers, cheteria, and Pengirans) and could be inherited and administered autonomously. Sarawak traders faced challenges due to these varied ownership structures and administrative approaches. Abdul Momin allowed varying degrees of trading access to Sarawak traders during negotiations with Brooke, who was primarily focused on expanding Sarawak's colonies from Datu Bay to Kidurong Bay and eventually to the Baram River, reflecting his persistent ambitions since the late 1860s to subjugate Brunei's territories.

1926 Admiralty chart of Baram River (bottom left) and Brunei

In 1870, Abdul Momin planned a tour to Baram but withdrew due to hostility from the local population. Without permission from the Sultan or the Consul General, Brooke and his wife toured Baram in 1872 and were warmly welcomed by the locals. The local Kayans were fined for murdering several Sarawak traders after the Sultan struggled to identify the offending tribe. However, in 1874, the Kayan of Baram revolted against Brunei after learning from Sarawak traders that more was demanded of them than what the Sultan had requested.

Charles Lee Moses transferred his rights to the lease to Joseph William Torrey who sold it to Baron von Overbeck for $15,000 in January 1876. Brooke presented Abdul Momin with a plan on 9 March, asking for the ceding of areas from Kidurong Bay to Baram River in exchange for a yearly payment of $1,200. The Sultan would get $600 of this total, with Pengiran Muhammad Alam, Pengiran Pemancha, and Pengiran Anak Chuchu sharing the remaining $600 evenly. As per the agreement, the Sultan would lose all jurisdiction and power over the lands upon their submission. Additionally, Brooke pledged to support the Bruneian government with any upcoming issues in an effort to deepen his relationship and friendship with the Sultan. In Brunei Town, the Sultan was provided with this draft plan by Datu Syahbandar, but he refused to give up or rent the areas in question. (Note: Two primary reasons led the Sultan to reject Brooke's proposal: first, he did not own all of the disputed territories; rather, a number of other aristocrats also owned them; and second, he was bound by an agreement with the British Government to refrain from ceding any Brunei territories without their consent. After then, the Sultan gave Datu Syahbandar the command to give Brooke the proposal document back.)

Abdul Momin refused, so Brooke purposefully cut the cession amounts paid out year once again. Brooke gave the Sultan $6,695 in silver and $1,500 in bronze Sarawak money in 1876; however, he withheld $6449.00 from this sum. Due to allegations that Bruneian traders, namely Captain Salam, Nakhoda Badar, Awang Sani, Awang Tengah, and Awang Badrudin, had appropriated properties from Sarawak traders conducting business in the Miri River, this deduction was made. Niah locals also took possession of a boat and other belongings that belonged to a trader named Mas Omar from Sarawak. Brooke withdrew $360.00 from the Sultan's yearly payment as a result of these incidences. The acts of Brooke and his statement claiming that the Sultan had not taken any action against the wrongdoers that Brooke had implicated horrified Abdul Momin. In actuality, Brooke personally observed these acts on his visit to Brunei Town, and the Sultan had already filed charges against the violators.

It is true that Brooke used the widespread deductions as a ploy to coerce the Sultan into ceding the lands he had been pursuing for some time, all the while avoiding making the required payments. False charges was one of Brooke's strategies to put further pressure on the Sultan. The treaty agreement on Brunei territory transfers and surrenders, which required Brooke to pay yearly fees for the ceded regions, was obviously violated by these acts.

Concession of Sabah

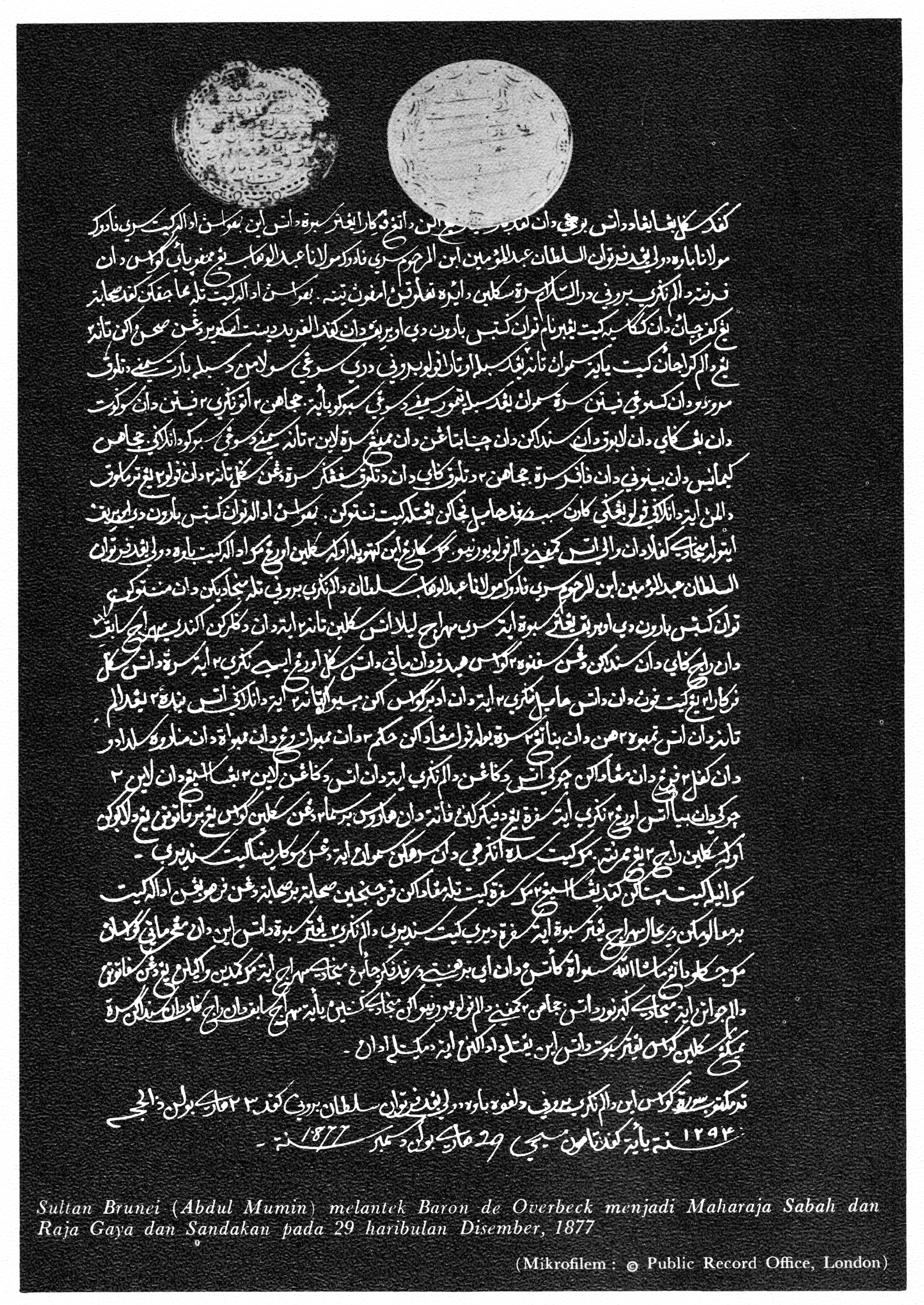
Sultan Abdul Momin of Brunei signed the first concession treaty on 29 December 1877

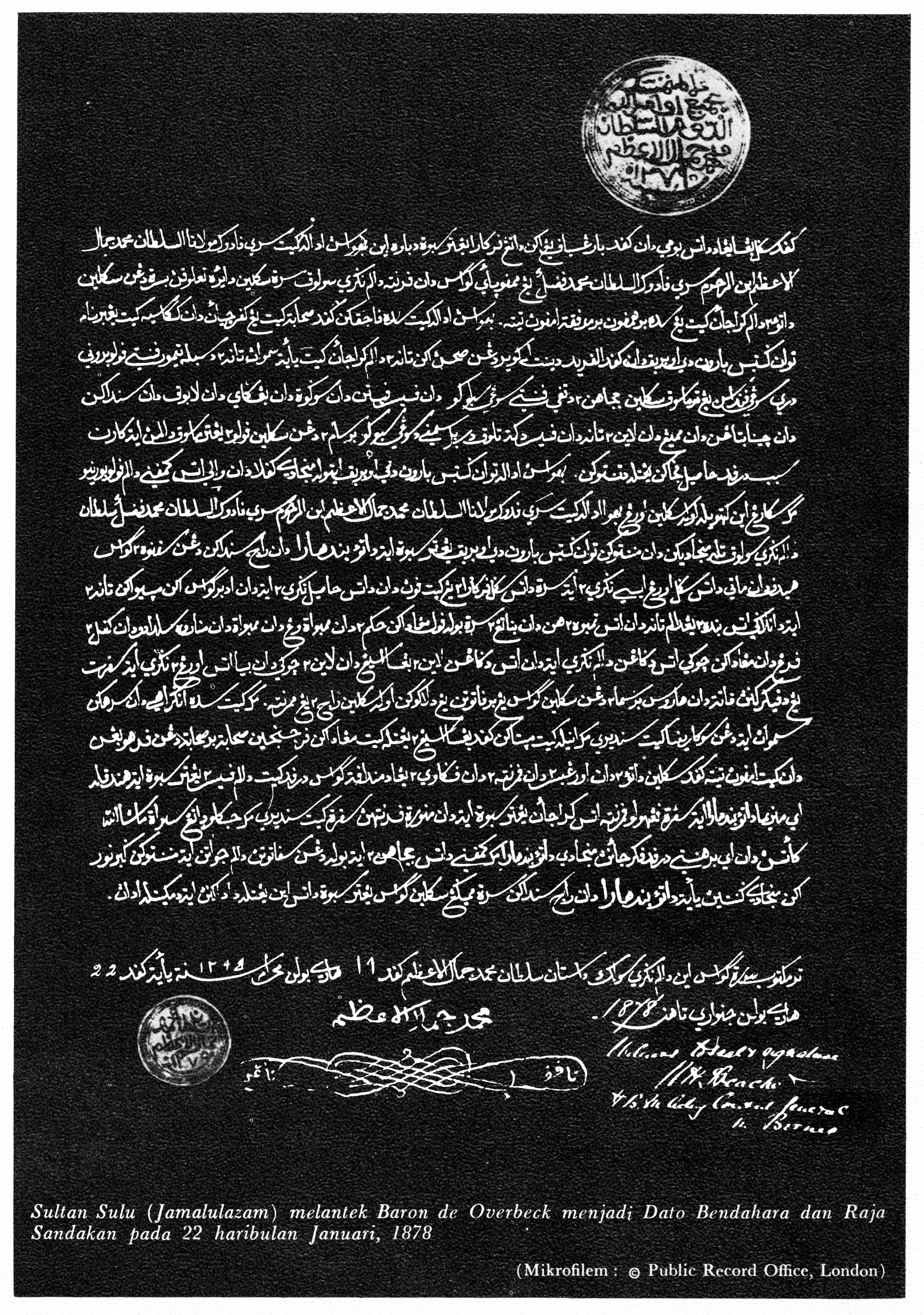
Sultan Jamal ul-Azam of Sulu signed the second concession treaty on 22 January 1878

Overbeck traveled to Brunei in 1877 to discuss a new lease with Abdul Momin. In the same year that the latter consented, the Concession of Sabah was signed. On 19 December, Overbeck was appointed Maharaja of Sabah, Rajah of Gaya and Sandakan and receive control over all territory in northern Borneo after the signing of an agreement with Abdul Momin. (Note: Other than as an honorific Sri Maharajah, it is uncommon in the Malay world. Therefore, even though Torrey was appointed "Supreme Ruler," the American didn't formally identify as "Rajah Torrey" until 1876, when he was in Hong Kong and well-known despite having a "very bad repute." Overbeck was also granted many titles as a Rajah, but instead of adopting the term "Supreme Ruler" in capital letters, he chose to use "Maharajah of Sabah," which appears inappropriate on a number of grounds.) In exchange, the Baron would provide the Sultan receiving an annual payment of $12,000, while the Pengiran Temenggong Pengiran Anak Hashim received a sum of $3,000. Overbeck went to Brunei and met the Pengiran Temenggong to renew the concession.

=== Baram River attack and compensation ===
A party of Kayans was said to have assaulted a British commercial ship that was anchored near the Baram River on 20 May 1880, during the night. The ship was inhabited by indigenous Kenyah and Kayan tribes. This river faces the South China Sea and is the biggest after the Rejang River. Five crew members lost their lives in the attack, and more than two were injured. The ship, which was worth $2,660, was confiscated. The thieves most likely retreated upstream, thus even though the Tulina River within Abdul Momin's realm, he was unable to bring them to justice. Peter Leys requested payment from Abdul Momin on behalf of the ship owner's family, offering 100 bundles of jungle rubber worth between $4,000 and $6,000 as reparations. As per the rules pertaining to territorial ownership in Brunei, the Sultan was responsible for both owning the land and exercising ultimate power over Brunei. Jungle rubber, although difficult to get its counterpart in cash, was an important product in Baram River, vital to commerce and the local economy.

Abdul Momin pledged in a meeting on 15 January 1882, to quickly settle the $2,660 in damages resulting from the ship seizure. The Sultan was reminded many times, but the damages were never paid. The Sultan eventually paid the sum out of his own pocket with some reluctance. On behalf of the ship owner, Peter Leys declined this payment, stating that it did not satisfy their demands. Leys appeared to be using this rejection to further his own goal of pressuring Abdul Momin to grant Brooke's request for Brunei territory extending from Kidurong Bay to the Baram River. Leys, anticipating the Sultan's incapacity to pay so much, further complicated matters with what seemed to be a private agreement between the two of them.

In a meeting on 15 January, Peter Leys shared with Abdul Momin a letter from the British Government dated 2 November 1881, outlining their position on Brunei's possible territory handover to Brooke's Sarawak. While not opposing Brunei's choice, the British government did state that any transfer to another foreign country would need British consent. When the Sultan heard this translated position from Muhammad Kassim, the British Consulate representative, he became enraged at what he perceived as Brunei's unjust treatment. Rejecting Brooke's expansionist aspirations, he made it clear in a public sermon that he had never meant to relinquish any Brunei lands to Brooke or any other body. This conversation brought to light Brunei's diplomatic challenges as well as Abdul Momin's unwavering refusal to cede Brunei's sovereignty to outside forces.

Peter Leys informed Brooke that Brooke approved of the British Government's accommodating attitude toward Brunei's territorial concession, which allowed him to pursue his expansionist goals. Then, in a letter to Sultan Abdul Momin, Brooke asked for the territory from Kidurong Bay to Baram River to be turned over, saying he was willing to negotiate through his delegates. The Sultan, however, strongly refused, claiming that the areas Sarawak had already been granted were adequate. To emphasise the need of maintaining geographical integrity for the Sultanate's sovereignty and standing within the Malay World, he compared Brunei to a body that had lost its arms.

=== Territorial loss and economic struggles ===
During Brooke's reign, Brunei's territory shrank, which had negative economic effects on the Sultanate in the 19th century. Prior to this, the Sultan and other landowners were able to maintain a steady revenue stream by imposing taxes on their citizens. But although Brooke benefited from territorial taxes, they were left with just yearly cession money from ceded territory once he formed his administration in Sarawak. The Sultan and other landowners suffered much as a result of Brooke's immoral acts, which included failing to pay agreed-upon cession money. As a result, they were unable to resist his actions and faced several difficulties. Even when the Sultan first refused, Brooke persisted in pressuring Abdul Momin to yield territory from Kidurong Bay to the Baram River. Brooke eventually persuaded the Sultan to send delegates to engage in negotiations. Brooke's delegation, who included representatives from Sarawak and Datu Syahbandar, arrived in Labuan on 24 May 1882. Following a short visit, later on 26th they moved on to Brunei Town to start discussions.

Charles Brooke requested land from Abdul Momin at first, but after discussions with Brooke's representatives, Abdul Momin eventually consented, offering either coercive measures or more financial incentives. Due to worries about economic disruption and Labuan's trading reputation, British consuls like as Pope-Hennesy and Bulwer originally supported Abdul Momin against Brooke's expansionist intentions in Brunei. But over time, British support for Brooke was progressively altered by his tenacious strategies, which included influencing events like the Baram River conflicts and withholding payments. A major setback for Abdul Momin and the Brunei Sultanate occurred in 1882 when Brooke was able to obtain Brunei holdings from Kidurong Bay to Baram River thanks to a shift in British policy.

The Sultan realised that further resistance was useless, so he agreed to lease Baram. In return, the Sultan received $3,000 annually, $2,000 was paid to Pengiran Temenggong Anak Hashim and two other Pengirans. In 1884, the British government granted the transfer of Baram and Trusan to Sarawak in 1882 and 1884, respectively. The transfer was also agreed by the Sultan and it allowed tribute to him.

In order to adjust to the changes, he restructured Brunei's government, signed treaties with the British, and took a tolerant and diplomatic stance. Notably, at Limbang in 1884, he eliminated taxes such the Tolongan, Labuh Sauh, Basuh Batis, and Serah Dagang. He established the Umanah (Amanat) in 1885 to thwart the Brooke family's and the British North Borneo Chartered Company's aggressive growth. But his attempts to protect Brunei's independence were short-lived since he died in 1885.

=== Amanat, 1885 to later years ===
Realising that Brunei would become extinct, Abdul Momin declared the Amanat, an oath between the Sultan, Wazirs, Manteris, and holders of Tulin rights not to cede or lease any remaining territories to the foreign powers. The Sultan met with his fellow nobility in 1885 in an effort to secure the kingdom's existence, and the two of them issued a proclamation promising not to give over, lease, or otherwise release any additional territory to foreign forces. The Amanat, a contract, was signed on 20 February 1885. The Amanat also attempted to force future Bruneian rulers and nobles to follow suit. In addition, the Amanat upheld the value of individual property rights and emphasized the significance of land and slave inheritance in line with long-standing Bruneian practices.

At that time, Brunei did not have the military strength to enforce the Amanat. Pengiran Temenggong Pengiran Anak Hashim, one of the Amanat's signatories, made an agreement that caused Brunei to lose the Trusan area shortly after, raising doubts about the Amanat's efficacy. Although their intentions were commendable, their shortcoming was that there was no consequence for defying them. This flaw is emphasised since the Amanat's failure to work was a major factor in Trusan's downfall and served as the impetus for the Brookes family's claim to Limbang.

The British had little interest in making financial investments in Brunei since the country had not demonstrated its economic worth. The least expensive alternative that would still satisfy the goals of the British Government was to hand up Brunei to the British powers that were already involved in a competition for Brunei's territory, namely the Brunei North Borneo Company (BNBC) and the White Rajah.

== Death and his tomb ==
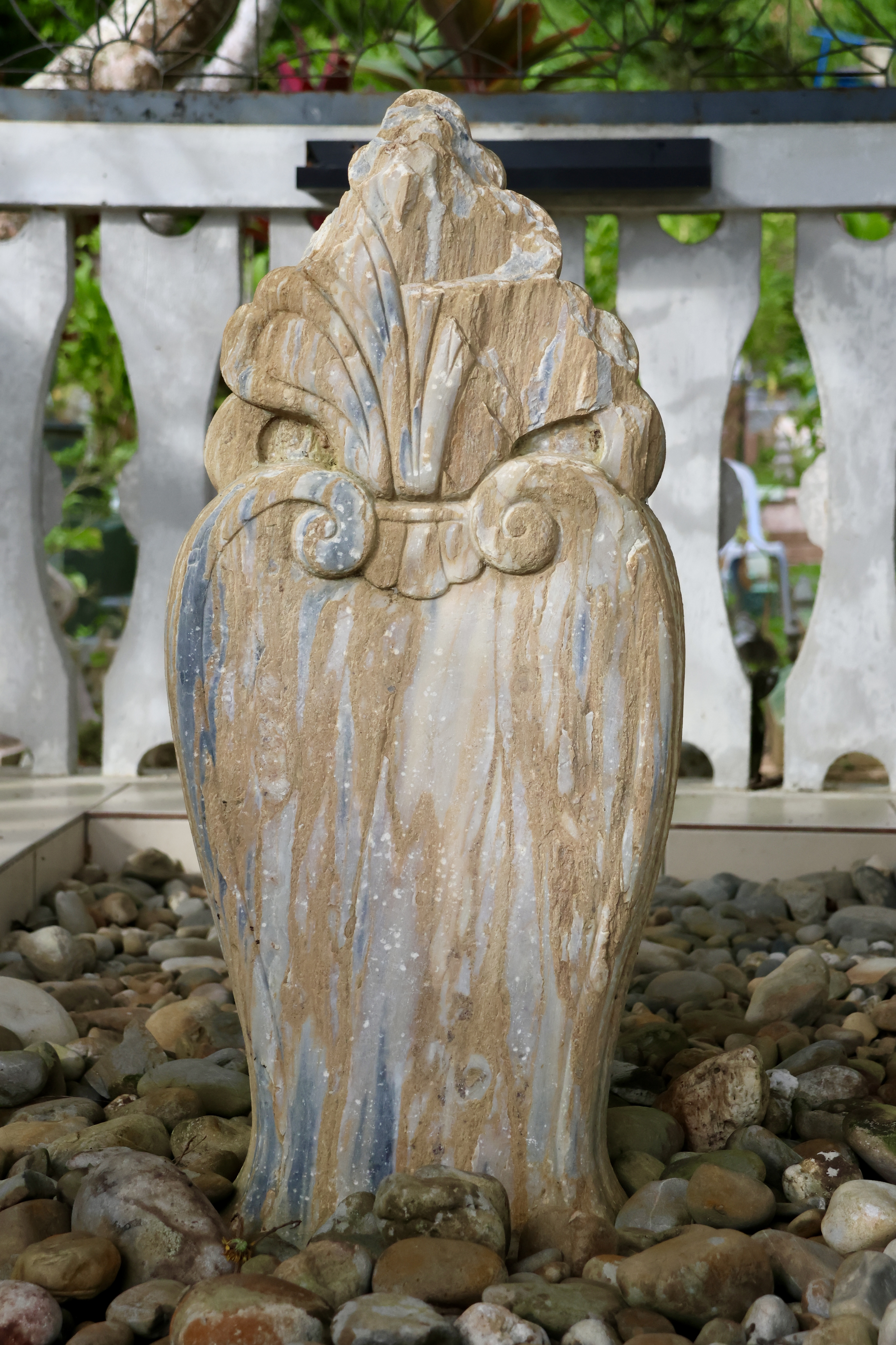
Alleged tombstone of Abdul Momin in 2024

Abdul Momin died on either Friday, 15 September 1885, or 29 May 1885, (Note: Jamil Al-Sufri, however, claimed that Abdul Momin died on 29 May 1885, in his papers "Sultan-sultan Brunei: Sistem Penggantiannya" at Seminar Dialog Pantai Kelantan from 2–4 June 1994, and "Nasab Sultan Brunei dan Pertarikhannya" at Seminar bagi Guru-guru Sejarah Sekolah-sekolah Menengah Negara Brunei Darussalam from 22–24 August 1994.) and his funeral was conducted the following evening at around 8 p.m. He had governed Brunei for 33 years, since 1852, and was thought to be over 100 years old at the time of his death. Prior to the burial, he was succeeded by his brother-in-law, Pengiran Temenggong Pengiran Anak Hashim. The coffin was transported from the palace to the ceremonial hall, the Lapau, and put in front of the throne to start the funeral procession. The coffin's arrival was followed immediately by Hashim's accession ceremony. He was given the royal dagger, Keris Si Naga, and invited by the Pengiran Bendahara to stand next to Abdul Momin's body. The nobat was played as the tribute to Abdul Momin was played seven times. The Pengiran Bendahara formally declared that Pengiran Temenggong was now Sultan Hashim Jalilul Alam Aqamaddin as the event came to a close.

Following the installation, the Nobat Ibrahim was played while the casket was carried to the Royal Mausoleum for interment. Following Abdul Momin's passing, officials and nobles attended religious readings and recitations in the palace, where guests were given contributions. The ceremonial spear, sword, and crown were among the other regalia that were delivered to Hashim during a dinner that was held forty days later to commemorate the conclusion of the mourning period. Significant rites were observed throughout both the burial and enthronement ceremonies, which strictly adhered to customary procedures that were modeled after historical sources.

Upon his death, Abdul Momin's tomb was erected. In 2013, Brunei History Centre undertook a beautifying project that was finished in 2016. Standing 780 millimetres (31 in) high, 360 millimetres (14 in) broad, and 105 millimetres (4.1 in) thick, the tombstone was once crafted from kulimpapa (Verbenaceae) wood, which naturally fossilised into stone over time. Its design has carved motifs of Daun Pucuk Paku and Daun Lukut. Oral history from the descendants of Abdul Momin attests to its validity even if it lacks inscriptions. According to one relative, Omar Ali Saifuddien III had told stories about the tomb, describing how, when he was a youngster, people would congregate near the tomb at night and light it up with spotlights.

== Bibliography ==
- Pengiran Haji Kamarul Zaman, Awangku Muhammad Nabeel (2019). "AN OBSERVATION OF CEREMONIAL PROCEDURES OF SULTAN ABDUL MOMIN'S FUNERAL (1885) AND SULTAN HASHIM'S ACCESSION TO THE THRONE (1885) AND CORONATION (1895): Continuity And Change". Jurnal Darussalam (in Malay). 19. Bandar Seri Begawan: Brunei History Centre, Ministry of Culture, Youth and Sports.
- Haji Ramli, Mardiah (2019). "Makam Sultan 'Abdul Momin (1852–1885)". Majalah Pusaka (in Malay). 47. Bandar Seri Begawan: Brunei History Centre, Ministry of Culture, Youth and Sports: 33–37.
- Mail, Asbol (2008). SULTAN ABDUL MOMIN'S RELATIONSHIP WITH THE BRITISH. History Department, Faculty of Arts & Social Sciences, Universiti Brunei Darussalam – via www.researchgate.net.
- Suryani, Nani (2007). A historical overview of Brunei's economy before the discovery of oil and some subsequent issues (PDF). Vol. 7. FASS, UBD.
- Sidhu, Jatswan S. (22 December 2009). Historical Dictionary of Brunei Darussalam. Scarecrow Press. ISBN 978-0-8108-7078-9.
- Mohammad bin Pengiran Haji Abd Rahman (Pengiran Haji) (2011). 3 penyair pemikir Muslim (in Malay). Pusat Daʼwah Islamiah. ISBN 978-99917-55-42-7.
- Yunos, Rozan (21 September 2008). "How Brunei lost its northern province". The Brunei Times. Archived from the original on 17 June 2014.
- Yunos, Rozan (7 March 2013). "Sabah and the Sulu claims". The Brunei Times. Archived from the original on 17 June 2014.
- Hussainmiya, B. A. (2006). Brunei: revival of 1906 : a popular history. Brunei Press. ISBN 978-99917-32-15-2.
- Luscombe, Stephen. "Brunei Protectorate". www.britishempire.co.uk.
- Awang Mohd Jamil al-Sufri (Haji) (2002). Survival of Brunei: A Historical Perspective. Brunei History Centre, Ministry of Culture, Youth and Sports. ISBN 978-99917-34-18-7.
- Ooi, Keat Gin (14 December 2015). Brunei - History, Islam, Society and Contemporary Issues. Routledge. ISBN 978-1-317-65998-3.
- Rabiqah Natasha Halim Binti Mohamed Yusof (March 2017). Brunei: Building and Enshrining an Absolute Monarchy (PDF) (Master of Philosophy thesis). Oxford Brookes University.
- Kamarul Zaman, Nabeel (December 2019). "AN OBSERVATION OF CEREMONIAL PROCEDURES OF SULTAN ABDUL MOMIN'S FUNERAL (1885) AND SULTAN HASHIM'S ACCESSION TO THE THRONE (1885) AND CORONATION (1895)". www.researchgate.net. Universiti Brunei Darussalam.

Regnal titles
Preceded by Omar Ali Saifuddin II	Sultan of Brunei; 1852–1885	Succeeded by Hashim Jalilul Alam Aqamaddin
