= Batu Tarsilah =

19th-century Bruneian stele

Genealogical Stone Tablet
- Batu Tarsilah
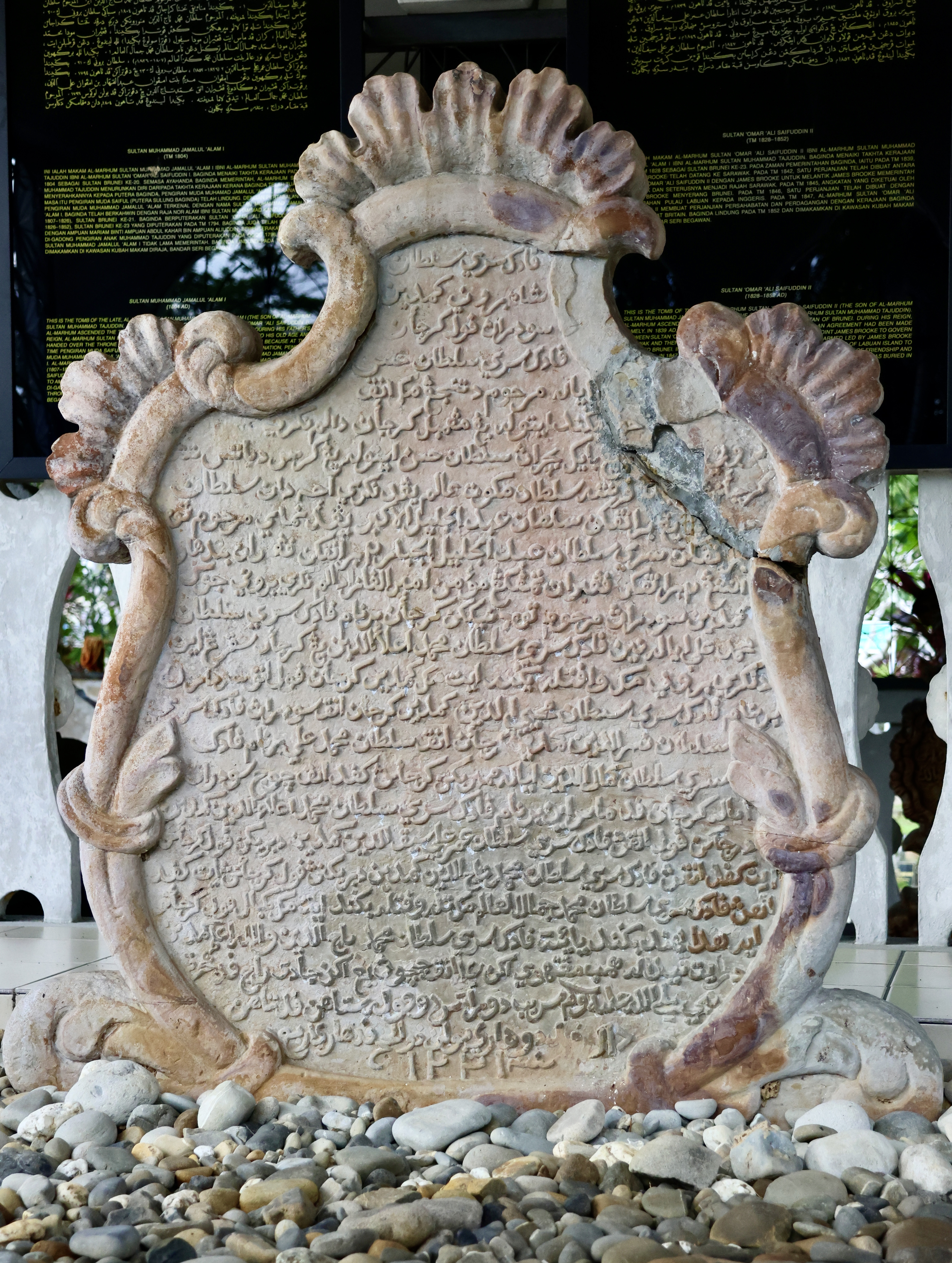
- Batu Tarsilah in 2024
- Type: Manuscript
- Material: Sandstone
- Length: 3.5 feet (1.1 m)
- Height: 4 feet (1.2 m)
- Width: 6 inches (150 mm)
- Writing: Jawi script
- Created: 8 February 1807
- Discovered: 1 June 1873
- Discovered by: Hugh Low
- Present location: Royal Mausoleum, Bandar Seri Begawan, Brunei
- Coordinates: 4.8853757°N 114.9343454°E
- Language: Classical Malay
- Period: Bruneian Sultanate

The Batu Tarsilah (Note: Also spelled as Batu Tersilah) (Genealogical Stone Tablet) is a stone tablet listing the genealogy of Bruneian sultans from 1363 to 1804 CE, in addition to historical records such as Malay manuscripts and oral narratives. The Batu Tarsilah, a stone inscription dating back to 1807, documents Brunei's royal ancestry and was commissioned by Sultans Muhyiddin and Husin Kamaluddin. The tablet is regarded as the most trustworthy source for verifying Brunei's monarchy's ties to the Prophet Moḥammad's lineage (Ahl al-Bayt) and the Quraysh through comparative research based on Islamic genealogy, hence bolstering the legitimacy and sovereignty of Brunei's rulers. The historical and cultural grandeur of the sultanate is symbolised by this tablet.

== Design ==
The Batu Tarsilah occupies a 20 square feet (1.9 m^{2}) space close to the Royal Mausoleum in Bandar Seri Begawan, and is 4 feet (1.2 m) high, 3½ feet broad, and 6 inches (150 mm) thick. It uses chiselling soft porous sandstone to record Brunei's royal lineage from Muhammad Shah to Muhammad Tajuddin. With a border of pucuk paku (fern) and the kayapu (Pistia stratiotes) flower gracing the upper borders, the stone, which was designed by Pehin Khatib Abdul Latif, has floral designs that represent wealth. One side's shoulder tip is damaged, perhaps by falling trees. The tombstone of Muhammad Tajuddin, is located on low land about 3 yards (2.7 m) distant on the northeastern side, whereas the tomb of Muhammad Jamalul Alam I is located on the same high ground as the tablet.

Like other Malay manuscripts, the stone-carved Batu Tarsilah manuscript uses Jawi script in khat styles such as Nash, Thuluth, and Parsi. It connects Brunei with more general Malay academia and illustrates the Islamic influence in the Nusantara area through its writing in Classical Malay. The author's scholastic background is demonstrated by phrases like "Wallahu 'A'lam" and Hijri dates. In order to preserve Brunei's royal lineage and historical Islamic character, the tablet has two sides: the front with 24 inscribed lines and the back with 26 lines.

The Batu Tarsilah manuscript begins directly with an explanation of its contents— the genealogy of the sultans of Brunei—without an Islamic invocation, possibly due to its role as a summary of the Salasilah Raja-Raja Brunei. It opens with "Inilah salasilah Raja-Raja yang Kerajaan di Negeri Brunei..." and emphasises the importance of this genealogy for future generations. The manuscript includes information about its author and the writing date in the colophon, indicating the Sultan's directive for its documentation, along with sources detailing its historical context.

== History ==
The Salasilah Raja-Raja Brunei, originally authored by Datu Imam Yaakub and continued by Pehin Khatib Abdul Latif, was transcribed by Pehin Orang Kaya Di-Gadong Seri Lela Awang Aminuddin on 5 November 1841 with Omar Ali Saifuddin II's permission. It was later recopied by Abdul Ghaffar bin Abdul Mu'min from Sarawak in November 1936. Meanwhile, the Batu Tarsilah, another critical genealogical record, was inscribed by Pehin Khatib Abdul Latif under Muhammad Tajuddin's orders on 2 Zulhijjah, A.H. 1221. Under the direction of Muhyiddin and Husin Kamaluddin, who ordered its transcription and supplied pertinent information, Datu Imam Yaakub chronicled the lineage, which is where the genealogical knowledge originates.

== Discovery and romanisation ==
Replica on display inside the Brunei History Centre
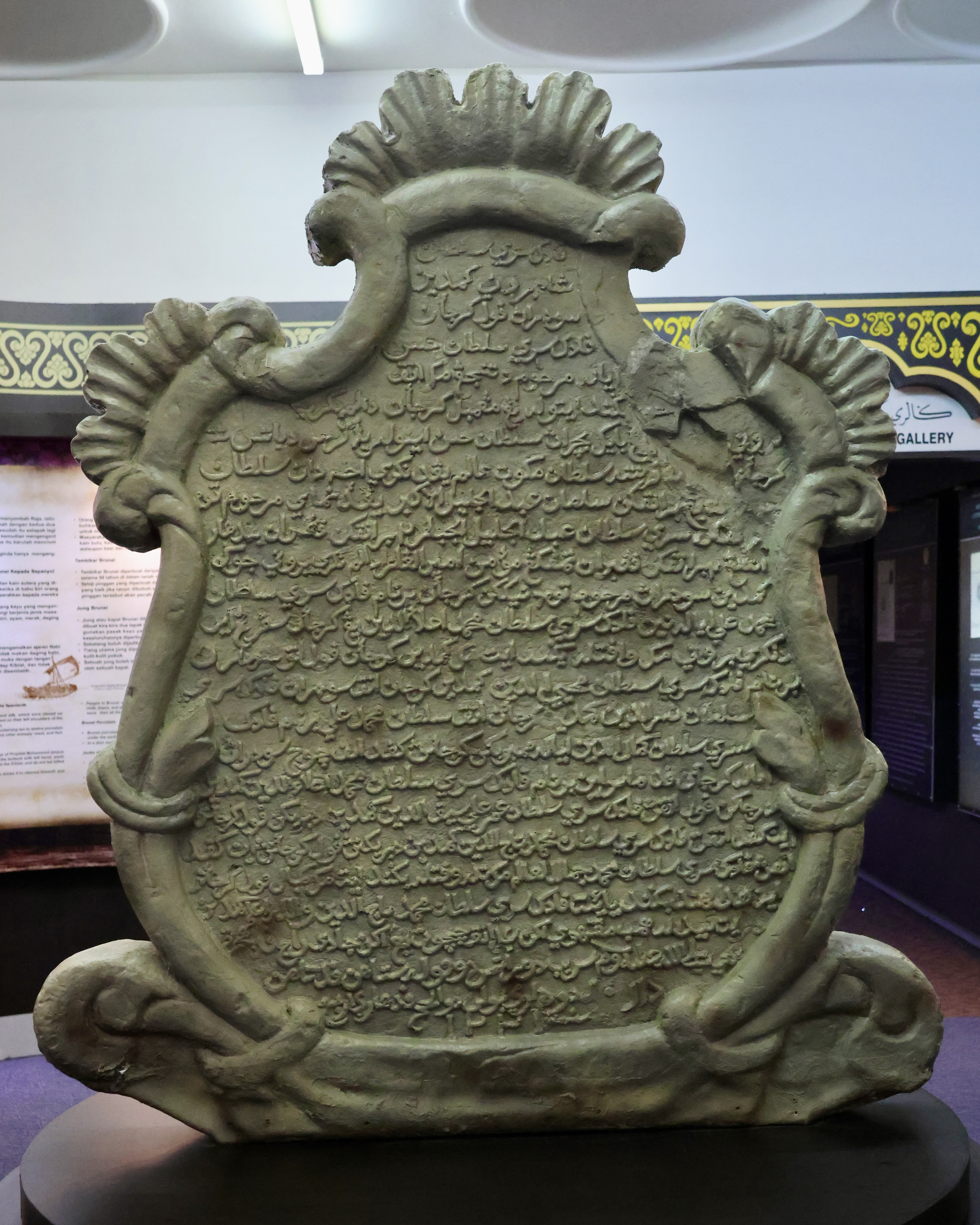
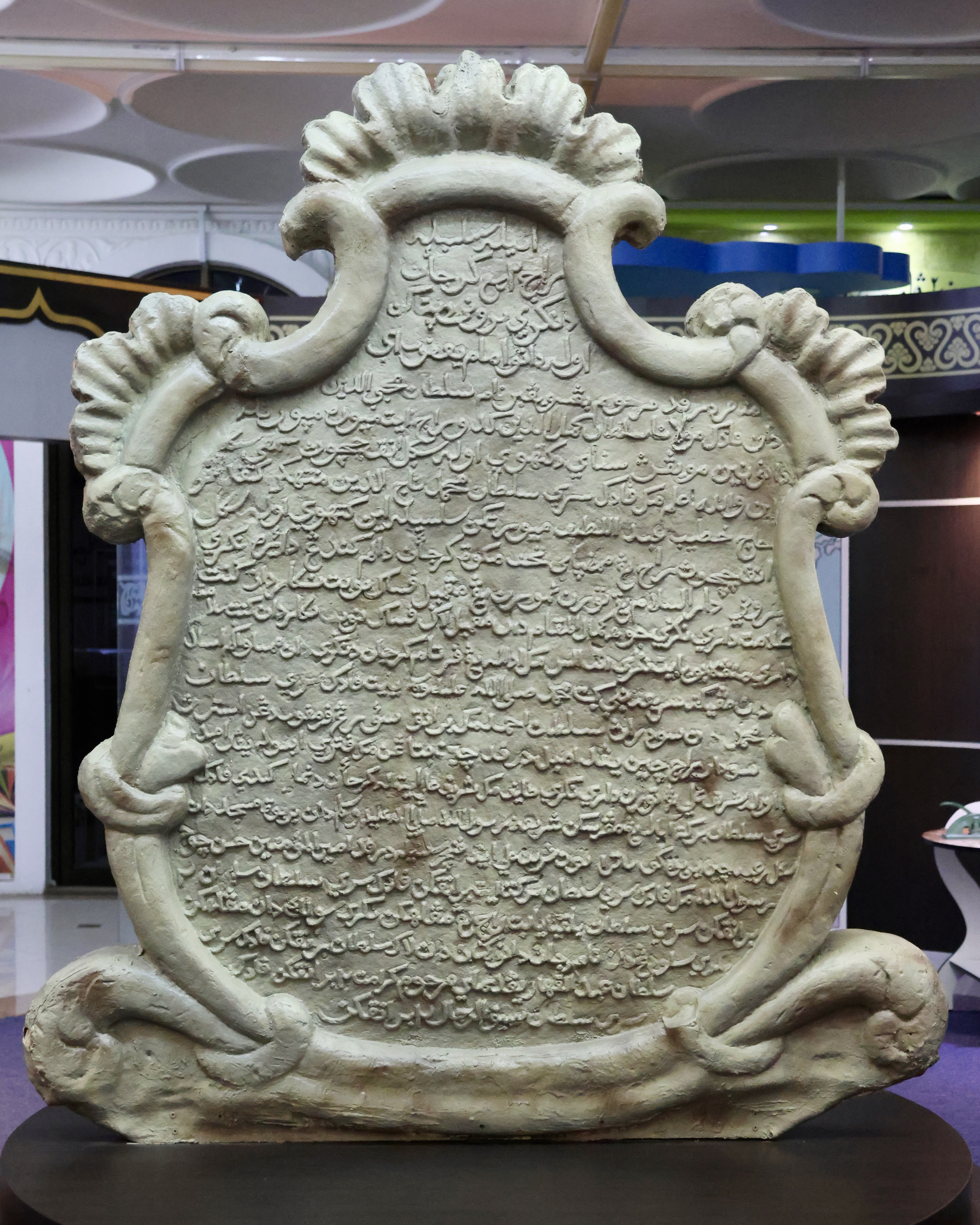

Hugh Low added to Brunei's historiography in his 1880 book by assembling notes and translations on the country's royal ancestry, including a translation and transcription of the Batu Tarsilah. This ancient tablet documents Brunei's royal lineage and is housed in the royal makam damit (small graveyard). Low's transcription, completed on 1 June 1873, was a component of a broader project that comprised individual historical documents describing Brunei's monarchs' lineage. Some errors in Low's transcription of the Batu Tarsilah likely stemmed from the unclear Jawi script on the stone itself or possibly from the manuscript he was working from. At that time, there was no standardised system for romanising Malay, so Low's transcriptions included variations like "nya" rendered as "nia," "ia" as "iya," and "menyuroh" as "meniurot." About a decade later, Allen Maxwell's Raja Muda spelling more closely aligned with modern usage. It appears Low's choices may have been influenced by British phonetics.

Amin Sweeney supports the date of 2 Zulhijjah, A.H. 1221, as corresponding to 8 February 1807, based on Syed Muhammad Naquib al-Attas's calculations that account for calendar differences. Although Low recorded this date as marking Muhammad Tajuddin's death, the sultan's tomb only indicates the year A.H. 1221. Low likely learned from the royal family that the tablet was created per the Sultan's instructions. Lines 8–9 of the tablet mention Muhammad Tajuddin's order to Haji Khatib Abdul Latif to document this genealogy during his rule, though whether it was completed before or after his death remains unclear.

Muhammad Jamalul Alam I's death date was first reported in the book Perpuspaan — 1 Ogos, 1968 as 1807; however, Language and Literature Bureau later changed this to A.H. 1219, equivalent to 1804 AD, which is consistent with sources that show his reign lasted six to nine months. This brief reign is confirmed by the fact that he took the throne on 15 Muharram, A.H. 1219 (27 April 1804) and died on 6 Sha'ban, A.H. 1219 (10 November 1804). Previous Low records that place Muhammad Jamalul Alam I's death in 1796 are incorrect since his father, Muhammad Tajuddin, succeeded to the throne soon after his grandfather, Omar Ali Saifuddin I, died on 10 July 1795. As a result, 10 November 1804, the updated date, is acknowledged as accurate.

== Legacy ==
As a representation of Malay ancestry and Islamic sovereignty, the Batu Tarsilah has great historical significance for Brunei. It was carved in 1807 as a more permanent and official form, but it was probably predated by written records on paper, which historian Sweeney argued existed before its carving. An essential primary source for tracing Brunei's royal ancestry, confirming its position as the oldest Malay Islamic sultanate in the area, and encapsulating the ideals of the Melayu Islam Beraja is the Batu Tarsilah. This tablet shows how Islam played a crucial part in forming Brunei's cultural and historical identity and emphasizes the value of cooperation between leaders and academics in preserving the country's legacy.

The "Memory of the World: Safeguarding Documentary Heritage in Brunei" workshop identified the Batu Tarsilah as one of the country's most important documentary legacies. The purpose of the event, which was hosted by Brunei's National Archives on 18 September 2019, was to raise awareness of UNESCO's Memory of the World Programme, which is dedicated to conserving documentary history. In order to better preserve its documentary legacy and interact with regional and global networks, Brunei wants to form a national Memory of the World committee, which this program supports.
