= Muhammad Tajuddin =

Sultan of Brunei from 1778 to 1804 and 1804 to 1807

Muhammad Tajuddin محمد تاجو الدين

Sultan of Brunei
- Reign: 1778–1804
- Predecessor: Omar Ali Saifuddin I
- Successor: Muhammad Jamalul Alam I
- Reign: 1804–1807
- Predecessor: Muhammad Jamalul Alam I
- Successor: Muhammad Kanzul Alam
- Died: 1807; Brunei
- Burial: Royal Mausoleum, Bandar Seri Begawan, Brunei
- Spouse: Raja Bulan
- Issue: Muhammad Jamalul Alam I; Pengiran Anak Muhammad Yusof
- House: Bolkiah
- Father: Omar Ali Saifuddin I
- Mother: Pengiran Anak Nur Alam
- Religion: Islam

Muhammad Tajuddin ibni Omar Ali Saifuddien I (Note: His name was spelled Muhammad Tajuddin ibnu Omar Ali Saifuddien I in the 2002 book Ririsej Brunei Darussum. The 2004 book Dokumentasi spelled him as Muhammad Tajuddin ibni Sultan Omar Ali Saifuddin I in spite of this.) (died 1807) was the sultan of Brunei from 1778 to 1804 and again from 1804 to 1807. He succeeded his father, Omar Ali Saifuddin I, to the throne in 1778, and served until 1804 before abdicating in favour of his son, Muhammad Jamalul Alam I. However, after his son died later that year, Tajuddin regained the throne and served until his death in 1807.

Sultan Muhammad Tajuddin was a just and wise ruler who governed Brunei based on Islamic principles. During his reign, he focused on trade, particularly with Java, Macao, and Manila, promoting goods like camphor and pepper, while strengthening relations with Spain through envoys to Manila. He also dispatched envoys to China to advertise Brunei's products. Tajuddin was deeply interested in Brunei's history, especially the genealogy of his royal ancestors, leading him to commission Pehin Khatib Haji Abdul Latif to compile the Salasilah Raja-Raja Brunei (Genealogy of the Sultans of Brunei) manuscript. Additionally, he ordered the construction of a waqaf house in Mecca to assist Bruneian pilgrims.

== Reign ==
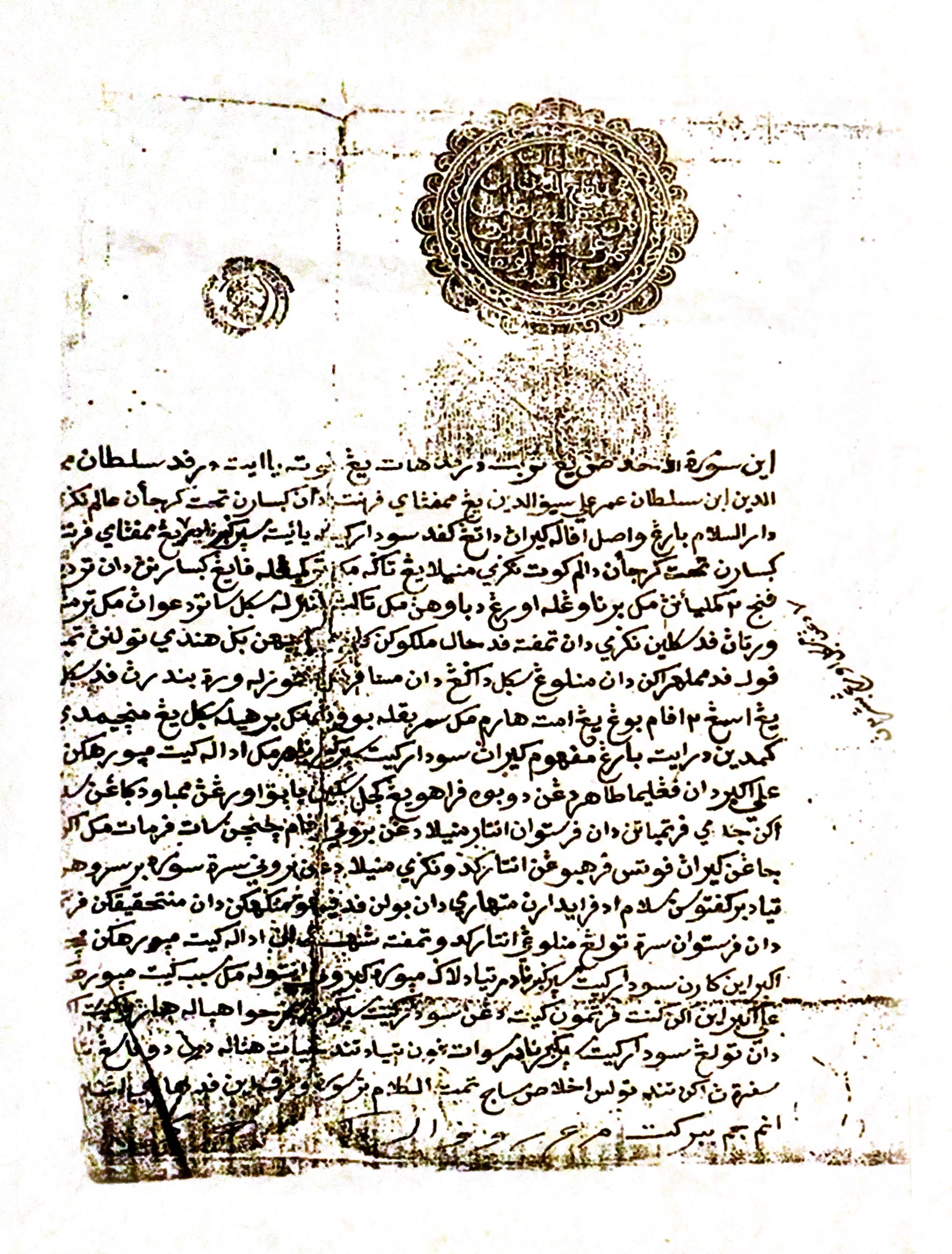
Letter from Tajuddin to the Spanish Governor General in Manila

Pengiran Muda Besar Muhammad Tajuddin is the son of Sultan Omar Ali Saifuddin I and Pengiran Anak Puteri Nur Alam, daughter of Husin Kamaluddin. Omar Ali Saifuddin I died on Thursday, 22 Zulhijjah 1209 (corresponding to 9 July 1795), according to the inscription on his tombstone. Omar Ali Saifuddin I abdicated prior to his death and left the government in the hands of his oldest son, Pengiran Muda Besar Muhammad Tajuddin, who went on to become the sultan of Brunei. According to a gravestone inscription, a son of Bendahari Omar Ali died in 1192 AH (1778 AD), under the rule of Tajuddin, as Jamil Al-Sufri points out. Given that his father had abdicated while still alive, this implies Tajuddin took the throne before the year 1795, which is usually recorded as 1778. Thus, before his father and predecessor died in 1795, Tajuddin governed Brunei for around 17 years.

Tajuddin made a significant contribution to preserving Brunei's royal ancestry by assigning Pehin Khatib Haji Abdul Latif the task of recording and completing the genealogy of Brunei's sultans. Realising the gaps in the historical record, particularly in the older Kitab Risalat al-Marhum fi 'Adat al-Marhum, compiled during Muhammad Alauddin's reign from 1730 to 1737, Tajuddin ensured that the lineage was updated and correctly preserved for future generations. Portions of this genealogy, continued in the Salasilah Raja-Raja Brunei manuscript copied during Omar Ali Saifuddin II's reign, are inscribed on the Batu Tarsilah stone tablet and include information about Muhammad Alam, Muhammad Kanzul Alam, and the reigning sultan, carrying on the efforts of Abdul Latif during Tajuddin's reign. The stone tablet would be placed near his grave after his death.

Tajuddin entrusted Abdul Latif with the task of acquiring a house in Mecca to serve as a waqaf property where a Bruneian home, known as a rumah wakaf, was built. The house was initially constructed for Brunei pilgrims, Sammaniyah members, and perhaps students (muqīmūn). Following the completion of the royal genealogy on 2 Zulhijjah 1221 (10 February 1807), Abdul Latif promptly carried out this directive. He successfully purchased a waqaf house on a plot of land in the Al-Shamiya District of Mecca, fulfilling the sultan's vision. The waqaf property was later officially registered with the syariah court in Mecca on Thursday, 15 Jumadilawal 1224 (corresponding to 28 June 1809). This action underscores his commitment to religious and charitable endeavours, ensuring the welfare of Bruneian pilgrims in the holy city.

Tajuddin willingly abdicated the throne in 1804 after ruling Brunei for over 26 years, believing he was growing too old. He passed the throne to his infant son, Pengiran Muda Tengah Muhammad Jamalul Alam, on Thursday, 15 Muharram 1219 (25 April 1804). When the sultan resigned, he became known as "Paduka Seri Begawan Sultan." Upon his coronation, he became Sultan Muhammad Jamalul Alam I, but his reign was short-lived as he died on Saturday, 6 Sha'ban 1219 (10 November 1804), just seven months into his rule. His son's premature death left his grandson, Pengiran Muda Besar Omar Ali Saifuddin, as the heir, but the young sultan was still a minor. Tajuddin then re-assumed the throne in November 1804 to govern the country until the child sultan reached adulthood. Realising his own age, he offered the regency to his son, Pengiran Anak Muhammad Yusof (also known as Pengiran Usop), but he declined due to the responsibility. Consequently, in 1807, Tajuddin's younger half-brother, Pengiran Digadong Ayah Pengiran Muda Muhammad Kanzul Alam, ascended to the throne, in line with the customary succession that included the late sultan's remaining male siblings.

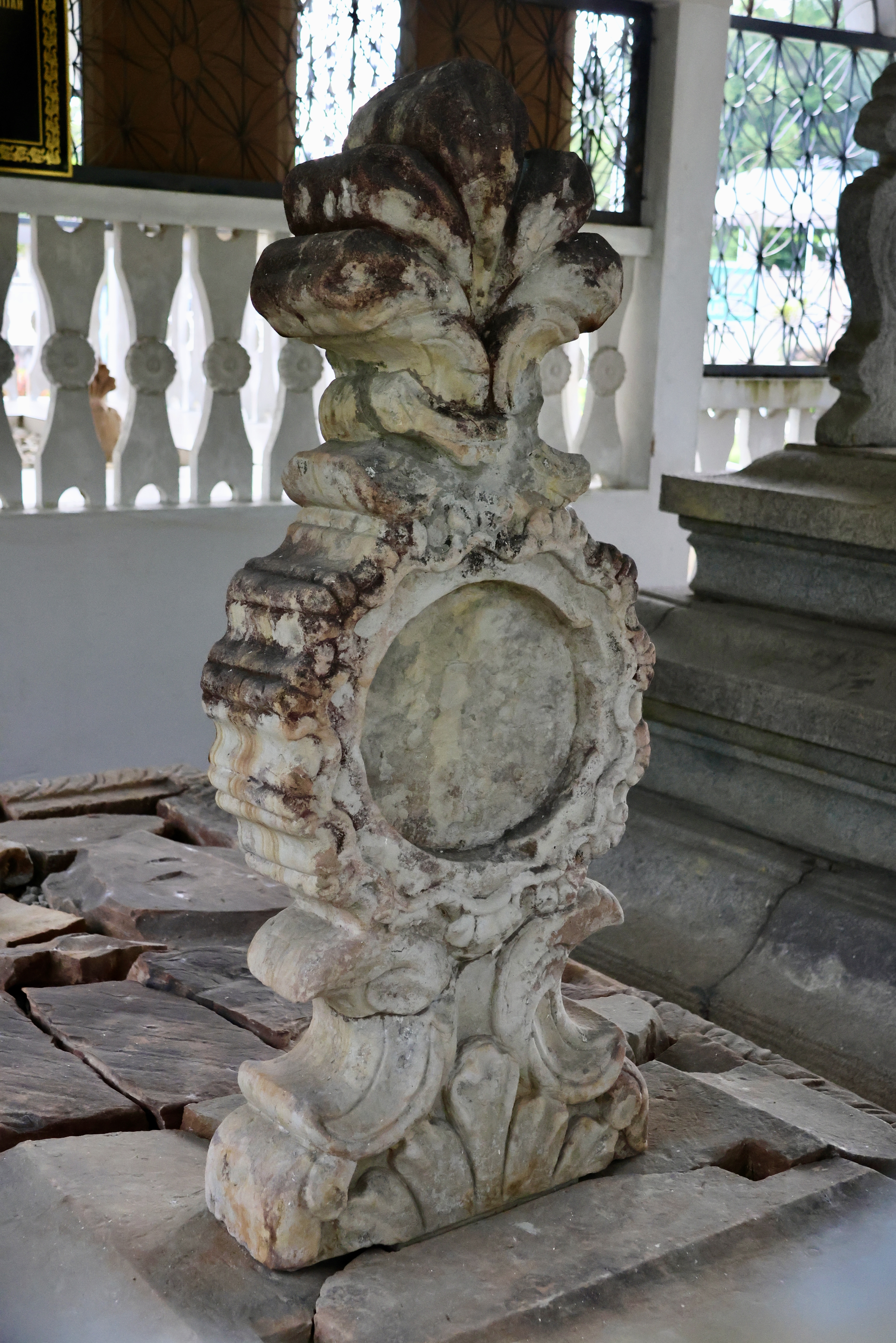
Tombstone of Tajuddin

Worried about a power struggle within the royal family, Tajuddin appointed Pengiran Digadong Ayah as regent for the young sultan. Tajuddin's concerns arose from Pengiran Digadong Ayah's multiple marriages to ensure male heirs, which led him to suspect that his stepbrother might seek to establish his own bloodline on the throne. To safeguard Omar Ali's eventual ascent, Tajuddin sought to preserve the royal family's traditional succession. However, after Tajuddin's death in 1807, Pengiran Digadong Ayah renamed his home the royal palace, signalling his intent to solidify his claim to the throne. He officially became Sultan Muhammad Kanzul Alam, and Tajuddin is laid to rest in the Royal Mausoleum. Kanzul Alam's numerous marriages and sons further hinted at his aspirations to secure the succession for his own lineage, despite the expectation that he would return the throne to the rightful heir.

== Personal life ==
Tajuddin married Raja Bulan binti Pengiran Digadong Pengiran Abdul, the granddaughter of Husin Kamaluddin, and together they had Pengiran Muhammad Jamalul Alam, who succeeded Sultan Muhammad Tajuddin as Sultan Muhammad Jamalul Alam I in 1804. Sultan Muhammad Jamalul Alam I married Raja Isteri Pengiran Nooralam, the daughter of Kanzul Alam. This couple also produced Omar Ali Saifuddin II, who ruled from 1828 to 1852. Omar Ali Saifuddin II married Tuan Zaidah, the daughter of Awang Sulaiman, the son of Pehin Orang Kaya Digadong Pengiran Seri Nara Pengiran Seri Ahmad. This marriage resulted in the birth of Hashim Jalilul Alam Aqamaddin, who reigned from 1885 to 1906. Tajuddin, being the half-brother of Kanzul Alam, in turn, became the uncle of Pengiran Muda Muhammad Alam, and Pengiran Muda Hashim.

== Notes ==
Regnal titles
Preceded by Omar Ali Saifuddin I Muhammad Jamalul Alam I	Sultan of Brunei; 1778–1804; 1804–1807	Succeeded by Muhammad Jamalul Alam I Muhammad Kanzul Alam
