= Muhammad Jamalul Alam I =

Muhammad Jamalul Alam I محمد جمال العلماء الأول

Sultan of Brunei
- Reign: 26 April 1804 – 10 November 1804
- Predecessor: Muhammad Tajuddin
- Successor: Muhammad Tajuddin
- Died: 10 November 1804; Brunei
- Burial: Royal Mausoleum, Bandar Seri Begawan, Brunei
- Spouse: Raja Isteri Pengiran Anak Puteri Noralam
- Issue: Pengiran Maulana Pengiran Digadong Pengiran Anak Muhammad Tajuddin; Pengiran Anak Omar Ali Saifuddin; Pengiran Muda Muta Alam
- House: Bolkiah
- Father: Muhammad Tajuddin
- Mother: Raja Isteri Pengiran Anak Bulan
- Religion: Islam

Sultan Muhammad Jamalul Alam I (died 10 November 1804) was the Sultan of Brunei, reigning briefly in 1804. He ascended to the throne on 26 April 1804, following the abdication of his father, Sultan Muhammad Tajuddin. His reign lasted approximately six and a half months until his death on 10 November 1804.

== Early life ==
Born as Pengiran Muda Muhammad Alam, he was the son of Sultan Muhammad Tajuddin and Pengiran Anak Bulan. His exact birth date remains uncertain, but he was raised in the royal household of Brunei, receiving education and training befitting a prince.

== Reign ==
Sultan Muhammad Jamalul Alam I's reign was brief, spanning only six and a half months. Nothing really important happened during his reign.

== Family ==
He was married to Pengiran Anak Nur Alam, and together they had several children, including:

- Pengiran Di-Gadong Sahibul Mal Pengiran Anak Muhammad Tajuddin
- Pengiran Anak Omar Ali Saifuddin
- Pengiran Muda Muta Alam

== Death and Succession ==
Sultan Muhammad Jamalul Alam I died on 10 November 1804. Following his death, his father, Sultan Muhammad Tajuddin, who had previously abdicated, reassumed the throne and ruled until his own death in 1807.

== Legacy ==
His early passing heavily impacted the course of Bruneian history. His death directly causing the rise of the House of Digadong and the Bruneian Civil War of 1826.

Regnal titles
Preceded by Muhammad Tajuddin	Sultan of Brunei; 1804	Succeeded by Muhammad Kanzul Alam
