= Muhammad Kanzul Alam =

Sultan of Brunei from 1807 to 1822

Muhammad Kanzul Alam محمد کنز العالم

Sultan of Brunei
- Reign: 1807–1826
- Predecessor: Muhammad Tajuddin
- Successor: Muhammad Alam
- Died: 1826; Brunei
- Burial: Royal Mausoleum, Bandar Seri Begawan, Brunei
- Spouse: Pengiran Anak Saleha; Pengiran Anak Salamah; Pengiran Anak Norsalam; Puteri Iranun
- Issue: Muhammad Alam; Raja Noor Alam; Pengiran Muda Hassan; Pengiran Muda Mohamed; Pengiran Muda Hashim; Pengiran Sri Banun; Pengiran Anak Abdul Rahman
- House: Bolkiah; Digadong
- Father: Omar Ali Saifuddin I
- Mother: Raja Puteri
- Religion: Islam

Muhammad Kanzul Alam ibni Omar Ali Saifuddin I (Note: Jawi: محمد كنز العالم بن عمر علي سيف الدين, romanised: Muḥammad Kanzul ʿĀlam ibn ʿUmar ʿAlī Sayfuddīn; Arabic pronunciation: [muˈhæməd ˈkænzʊl ˈɑːləm ˈɪbni ˈuːmɑr ˈɑːli seɪfʊdˈdiːn]) (died 1826) was the sultan of Brunei from 1807 until his death in 1826.

Kanzul Alam succeeded Muhammad Tajuddin as sultan of Brunei in 1807, but since he had broken a contract with his predecessor, his rule was marked by internal conflict. Even though Omar Ali Saifuddin II still possessed the royal regalia, his son Muhammad Alam felt entitled to the throne as he rose to prominence during his own rule. Perhaps as a result of Muhammad Alam's severe and autocratic actions, a civil war broke out between him and his followers after Kanzul Alam's death in 1826.

== Early career ==
Pengiran Muda Muhammad Kanzul Alam (Note: His name was written Khan Zul Alam and Kanzul-alam in earlier Malay language romanisations.) was the son of Sultan Omar Ali Saifuddin I and Raja Puteri. Before his ascension to the throne, he held the title of Pengiran Digadong or Pengiran Digadong Ayah, serving as the second-highest ranking wazir (vizier) in Brunei's 19th century government during the reign of his elder half-brother, Muhammad Tajuddin. In 1795, Muhammad Tajuddin started Brunei's commerce with Portuguese Macau, which Kanzul Alam continued, with Portuguese records showing that between 1794 and 1810, around 23 ships traded textiles, ceramics, currency, and metal goods for Brunei's exports of bird's nests, trepang, wax, black pepper, rattan, and camphor.

== Reign ==
=== Succession and power struggles ===
Brunei's royal succession customs prioritise the eldest son of a deceased sultan or, if no son exists, other male heirs within the family. Occasionally, a male sibling or even a son-in-law may succeed, though only with widespread public support and royal family consensus. This tradition influenced Kanzul Alam's claim to the throne in 1807. Initially, in 1804, Muhammad Tajuddin abdicated in favour of his son, Pengiran Muda Tengah Muhammad Jamalul Alam, who ruled briefly before his untimely death. With an infant heir now designated, Muhammad Tajuddin reclaimed the throne until his grandson reached maturity.

Kanzul Alam willingly accepted the role of regent. Yet, mindful of Kanzul Alam's ambitions to advance his own lineage, Muhammad Tajuddin appointed Pehin Jawatan Dalam Awang Munap and the heir's mother, Raja Isteri Noor Alam, as additional advisors to the young Pengiran Muda Omar Ali Saifuddin II. This move aimed to preserve the royal lineage and stability within Brunei's political traditions, ensuring that Omar Ali would eventually ascend to the throne. Muhammad Tajuddin, cautious about Kanzul Alam's commitment to their 1806 agreement, hoped these measures would prevent a potential power struggle.

Upon becoming regent to Omar Ali, Kanzul Alam seemed to embrace his newfound authority. Following Muhammad Tajuddin's passing, he assumed the title of sultan and declared his residence a palace. The line of succession appeared secure, especially given that his daughter, Raja Isteri Noralam, was the infant heir's mother, likely garnering public support. However, Kanzul Alam's multiple marriages and efforts to produce male heirs suggest his intent to establish his own dynasty. This ambition resurfaced over two generations, as other family members—most notably Pengiran Muda Muhammad Alam and later Pengiran Muda Hashim—attempted to consolidate power within their lineage. (Note: Muhammad Alam faced strong opposition from his half-sister, Raja Noor Alam, who fiercely protected her son, Omar Ali Saifuddin II's, succession rights and resisted both her father's and brother's attempts to claim absolute control.)

As noted by Yura Halim in 2009, Muhammad Tajuddin initially offered the regency to another son, Pengiran Anak Muhammad Yusof, who declined due to the role's extensive responsibilities. With Muhammad Yusof's refusal, Kanzul Alam became the next choice and eventually took the throne, with Muhammad Tajuddin reluctantly abdicating in 1807, allowing Kanzul Alam to serve as regent.

=== Resistance to European influence ===
Also under his rule, local chiefs remained watchful and skeptical of foreign envoys as Brunei grew more and more concerned about European intrusion. This prudence was required, according to Jamil Al-Sufri's book titled, Survival of Brunei in 2009, since European powers' attempts to exert influence throughout Southeast Asia were frequently thwarted by courageous Bruneian leaders like Muhammad Alam. Even the sultan of Sulu sent yearly tribute offerings to placate him because of his fearsome reputation. In a similar vein, the Bugis community maintained goodwill and paid homage to the royal family when traveling through Brunei's waterways.

In 1809, a British ship led by Lieutenant Si Merah arrived in Brunei, challenging the strength of the Bruneians with a tiger and demanding that Brunei cede land if the tiger could not be defeated. The bet was taken up by Pengiran Pemancha Muhammad Daud, who demonstrated extraordinary bravery by overpowering the tiger, earning him the nickname Pengiran Pemancha Rimau. Meanwhile, Si Merah, in front of Kanzul Alam, rudely asked for Muhammad Alam and upon being shown the prince, gave a sarcastic salute. In response, Muhammad Alam reacted forcefully, grabbing Si Merah and throwing him across the hall. Kanzul Alam intervened to prevent further violence, allowing Si Merah to escape back to his ship and depart Brunei. Pengiran Muda's actions were seen as a defence of Brunei's sovereignty and his father's authority, asserting the strength and pride of the Bruneian royal family.

Due to the threat posed by pirate activity along the coast of Borneo in the 19th century, the sultan of Banjarmasin sought British aid, which in turn caught the government in British Bengal's attention. To prevent piracy and safeguard British commerce, the British dispatched Captain Robert C. Garnham to blockade Bornean ports, with the exception of Pontianak, Banjarmasin, and Brunei, by taking advantage of a power vacuum in West Borneo caused by the Dutch's emphasis on Europe. Kanzul Alam was forewarned by Garnham to obey or risk British action. Although local sources indicate that the sultan's court approved the arrangement, Garnham swiftly wrapped up his business and departed Brunei because he was uncomfortable with Muhammad Alam's severe and irritable manner during the audience.

=== Muhammad Alam's ascension and death ===
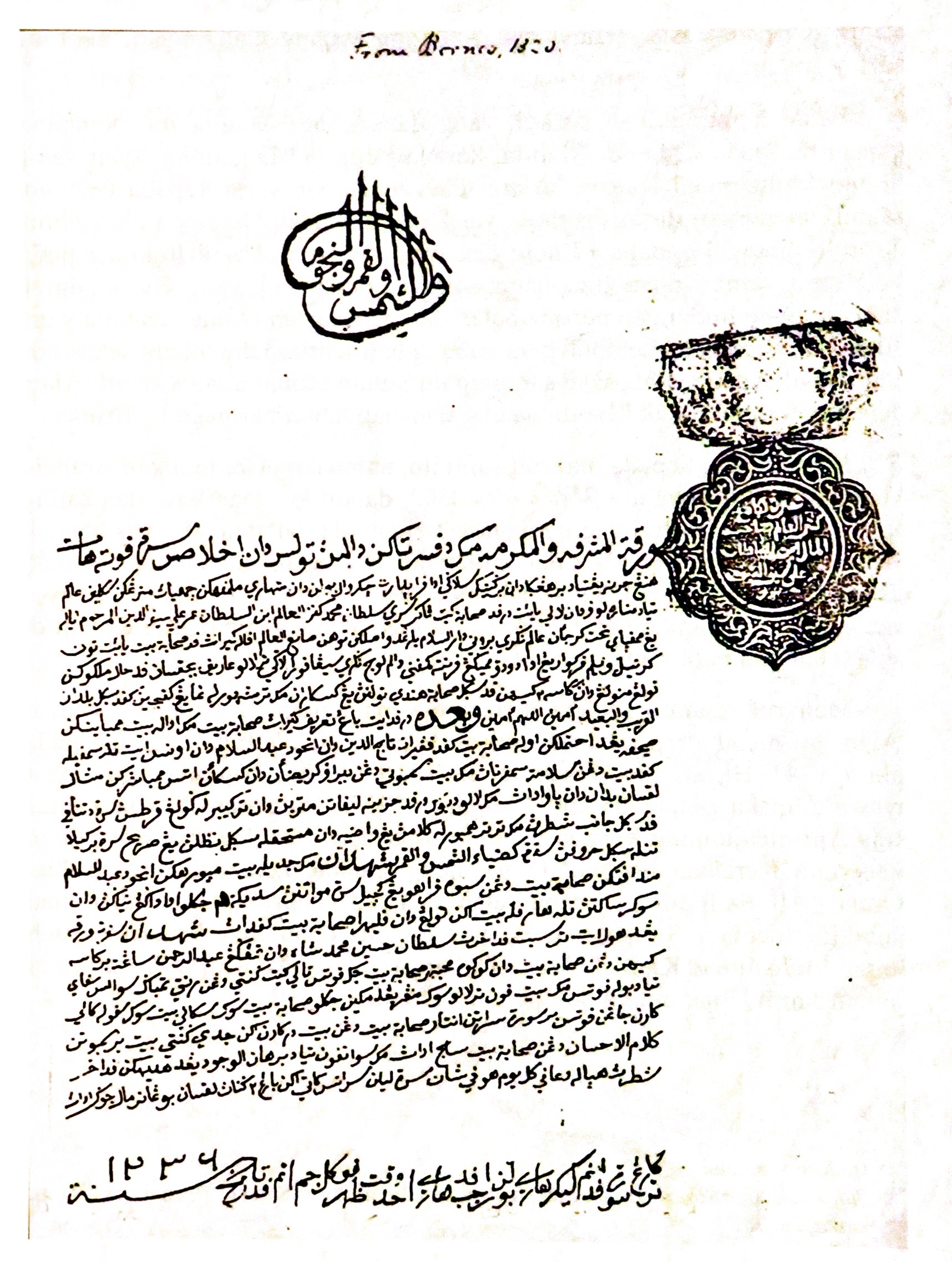
Letter from Kanzul Alam to Farquhar on 29 April 1821

During his own rule, Kanzul Alam pursued an isolationist foreign policy, minimising contact with European powers while maintaining cordial relations with them. In 1820, he conferred the title of Pengiran Indera Mahkota on Pengiran Mohammad Salleh and expressed Brunei's willingness to assist Captain William Farquhar, who had written to inform the sultan about the new British settlement in Singapore. During this time, Muhammad Alam continued to exert significant influence, particularly in the realm of economic affairs. (Note: Pengiran Muda Muhammad Alam played a key role in protecting Brunei when Sharif Hasan Al Habsi from Hadramaut threatened to conquer the kingdom, forcing him to surrender and seek forgiveness after he and his allies confronted him. Despite the authority of his father, Kanzul Alam, it was he who ultimately decided Al Habsi's fate, pardoning him and allowing him to settle in Brunei, where his descendants still live.) Letters from Farquhar in July 1820 and June 1821 illustrate Muhammad Alam's central role in trade, although he remained deferential to his father's authority by ensuring Kanzul Alam replied to Farquhar's correspondence. Kanzul Alam's response to Lieutenant Spiers' abrupt departure, which expressed Muhammad Alam's regret and aimed to prevent future issues, further highlighted the cooperative relationship between father and son.

Meanwhile, during his father's reign, Muhammad Alam undoubtedly held significant authority and influence, with some evidence suggesting he may have even served as the "deputy sultan" before Kanzul Alam's passing. As the sultan became less involved in state affairs, Muhammad Alam assumed a more prominent role. In 1823, a Dutch diplomat sent a message for the sultan, but it was Muhammad Alam who received and responded to it. Furthermore, when Kanzul Alam fell ill in 1826, Muhammad Alam formally requested the throne, a request his father granted, though certain regalia were reserved for Omar Ali in accordance with a prior arrangement. These incidents point to Muhammad Alam already exercising full control over Brunei's affairs between 1823 and 1826, reinforcing claims that he effectively governed during his father's later years.

A significant shift in Brunei's economic strategy occurred in 1824 when the sultan sent 119 prahus to Singapore, loaded with valuable goods such as antimony and black pepper. The appointment of Pengiran Indera Mahkota as governor in 1827 demonstrated Kanzul Alam's intent to assert Brunei's authority in Sarawak, aiming to control its resources, particularly antimony and gold. However, this move antagonized the local Sarawak Malay elite, who grew increasingly hostile to Brunei's interference and Mahkota's exploitation of the region.

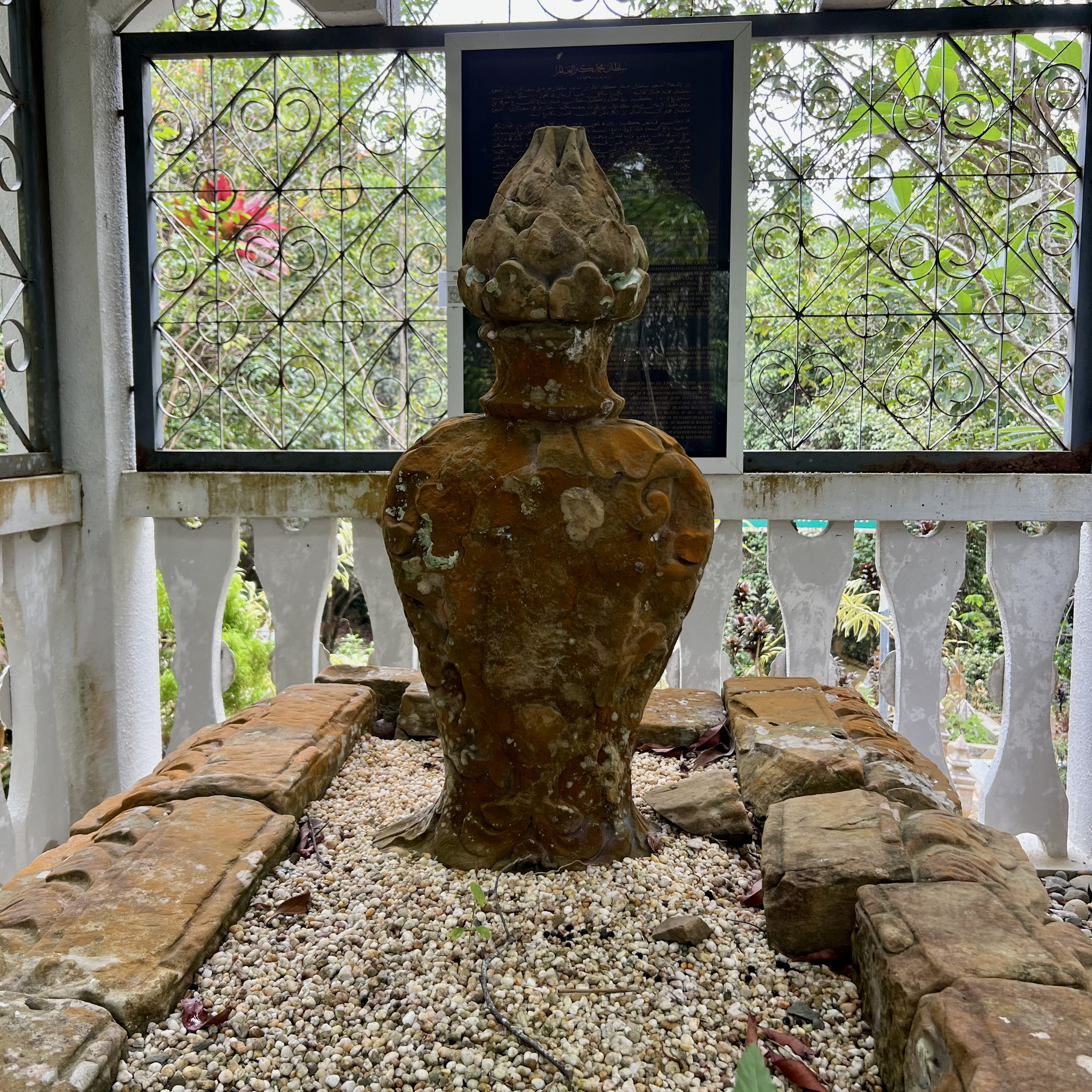
Tombstone of Kanzul Alam at Royal Mausoleum

After receiving his father's approval to ascend the throne, Muhammad Alam felt confident in his claim to leadership, despite lacking the crown and the state Keris Si Naga, symbols of absolute power. His attempt to usurp the throne, however, was met with opposition, as it violated the pact between Muhammad Tajuddin and Kanzul Alam and breached Brunei's established succession laws. Muhammad Alam's claim in 1826 was further complicated by the rise of Omar Ali, who had matured into a capable young man and was seen as the legitimate monarch. While Muhammad Alam's strong leadership and authoritarian nature earned him admiration, especially from foreign envoys, it also alienated the local populace, leading to widespread dissatisfaction and resistance. His reign, marked by power struggles and divisions, left a legacy of turmoil within Brunei. Following Kanzul Alam's death, Muhammad Alam declared himself sultan, sparking Brunei's civil war. Historians remain divided on the exact year of Kanzul Alam's passing, with Hugh Low (1880) suggesting 1822, Brown (1970) and Moor (year unknown) proposing 1824, and Hughes Hallett claiming the civil war and Muhammad Alam's death occurred before 1828.

== Personal life ==
Kanzul Alam married his first wife, Pengiran Anak Saleha @ Sa Lia, and they had a daughter, Raja Nur Alam, who later became the wife of Sultan Muhammad Jamalul Alam I. He then married his second wife, Pengiran Anak Salamah ibnu Pengiran Seri Rama, and they had Sultan Muhammad Alam, (Note: Hugh Low said that Muhammad Alam's mother was Kanzul Alam's third wife, but he had previously married Pengiran Anak Saleha and Pengiran Anak Norsalam.) Pengiran Muda Hashim, and Pengian Badaruddin. Lastly, he married his third wife, Pengiran Anak Norsalam ibnu Pengiran Seri Rama, a sibling of Pengiran Anak Salamah. (Note: Her name was sometimes spelled Pengiran Nooralam.) His daughter, Raja Nur Alam, would go on to become the Raja Isteri to Muhammad Jamalul Alam I, and from this marriage came Sultan Omar Ali Saifuddin II. Among his other children were Pengiran Muda Hassan, Pengiran Muda Mohamed, and Pengiran Sri Banun were among his children. Kanzul Alam's lineage would later connect to Sultan Hashim Jalilul Alam Aqamaddin, whose descendants continued to play significant roles in Brunei's royal line and governance.

== Notes ==
Regnal titles
Preceded by Muhammad Tajuddin	Sultan of Brunei; 1807–1826	Succeeded by Muhammad Alam
