= Omar Ali Saifuddin I =

Sultan of Brunei from 1740 to 1778

Omar Ali Saifuddin I عمر علي سیف‌الدین ١

Sultan of Brunei
- Reign: 1740–1778
- Predecessor: Husin Kamaluddin
- Successor: Muhammad Tajuddin
- Died: 10 July 1795
- Burial: Royal Mausoleum, Bandar Seri Begawan, Brunei
- Spouse: Pengiran Anak Puteri; Pengiran Anak Nor Alam; Pengiran Anak Bongsu; Wan Puteh
- Issue Detail: Sultan Muhammad Tajuddin; Sultan Muhammad Kanzul Alam
Names
- Omar Ali Saifuddin ibni Muhammad Alauddin
Regnal name
- Sultan Omar Ali Saifuddin I ibni Al-Marhum Sultan Muhammad Alauddin
- House: Bolkiah
- Father: Sultan Muhammad Alauddin
- Mother: Pengiran Anak Sharbanun
- Religion: Sunni Islam

Omar Ali Saifuddin I ibni Muhammad Alauddin (died 10 July 1795), also known as Al-Marhum Makam Besar, was the 18th Sultan of Brunei and the second son of Sultan Muhammad Alauddin. He was regarded as one of the longest-serving sultans and was renowned for his wise leadership and just rule, merely following his father-in-law, Sultan Hussin Kamaluddin. In fact, he received helpful knowledge, counsel, and experience from his father-in-law when he was still alive during his reigning period.

== Reign ==
Sultan Husin Kamaluddin subsequently gave Pengiran Muda Tengah Omar Ali Saifuddin the sultanate of Brunei. In 1740, Pengiran Muda Tengah Omar Ali Saifuddin assumed the title of Sultan Omar Ali Saifuddin I. According to Sir Hugh Low, the new Sultan was still very young when he ascended the throne. It appears that the restoration go the Bendahara line and the end of the so-called legitimate or usurper rule coincided with the ascension to the throne of Sultan Omar Ali Saifuddin I. On the other hand, Spanish accounts claimed that the deceased Sultan obviously had no legal son, whereas Brunei sources Sisilah Raja-Raja Brunei and Batu Tarsilah assert that Sultan Omar Ali Saifuddin I was the heir.

After Omar Ali Saifuddin learned about the situation in Manila of the Philippines, due to it being Bruneian territory, he was not pleased. As a result, he gave command to attack Sultan Alimuddin in Manila with his forces under the command of Pehin Orang Kaya Di-Gadong Seri Lela Awang Aliwaddin in 1769. The mission didn't arrive in Manila until 1769 because the expedition's preparations took so long. Sultan Alimuddin had already departed Manila for Sulu, therefore Manila was under Spanish rule when the siege began. The siege would go on to be a success as Manila was captured by the Brunei sultanate.

The conflict over North Borneo, also known as Sabah, began after which a promise made by Sultan Muhyiddin to the Sultan of Sulu after Sulu helped him win the Brunei Civil War that went in his favor. Sulu attacked Brunei in 1771 after he had become severely weakened. Sultan Omar Ali Saifuddin signed a deal with the British Empire in June 1774 to secure outside support. The British were looking for a storehouse along the way to Canton and received exclusive rights to the pepper trade in exchange for their military assistance. When Sulu despatch a force under the command of Datu Teting to attack Balambangan in 1775, its leaders sought safety in Labuan after the British quickly established a presence in Brunei. When the two forces clashed, Datu Teting surrendered and his troops fled back to Sulu after learning that the warriors of Brunei, led by Pengiran Temenggong Ampa, were far too strong for them to defeat. Thomas Forrest visited Brunei in February 1776. Despite Labuan's offer, the British left Brunei in 1777 due to the financial collapse of Balambangan, losing the entire East India Company.

Sultan Omar Ali Saifuddin I ruled until the year 1778. He abdicated his position in favour of his son, Pengiran Muda Besar Muhammad Tajuddin, later known as Sultan Muhammad Tajuddin, being the heir.

== Death and his tombstone ==
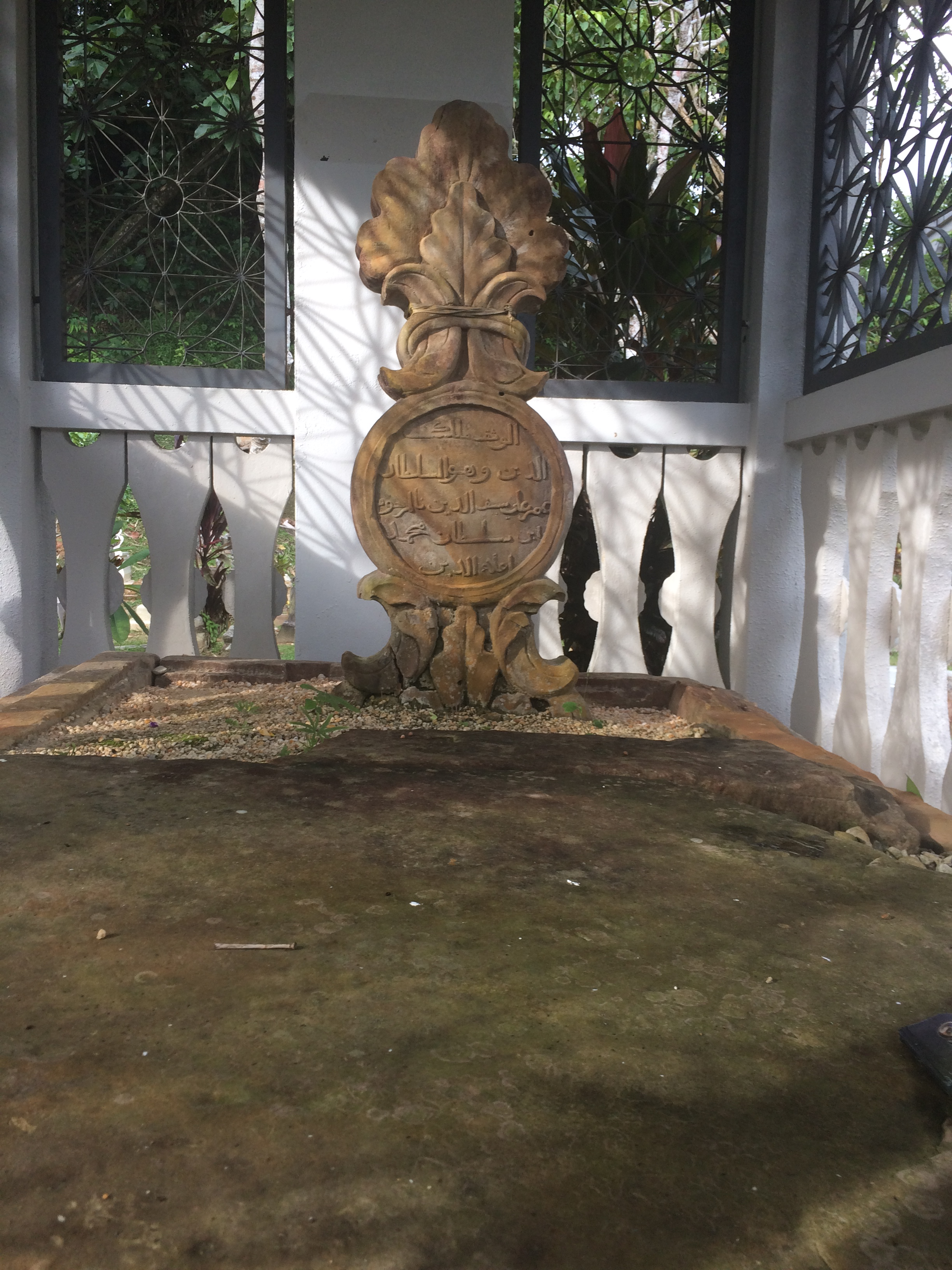
Tombstone of Omar Ali Saifuddin in 2017

On Thursday, 16 October 1795, Sultan Omar Ali Saifuddin I was laid to rest. Batu 1½, Jalan Tutong, Bandar Seri Begawan, the Royal Mausoleum houses the tombstone of Omar Ali Saifuddin I. He was the first sultan to be buried at this area, starting a custom that would be followed by succeeding sultans. The tombstone's traditional Brunei Malay limestone carvings, which include elaborate patterns of setampik leaves, lukut leaves, and kiyapu flowers, are what make it noteworthy. The name of the sultan and the date of his passing are written in Jawi script. It is approximately 1.10 centimetres (0.43 in) high, 48 centimetres wide, and 14 centimetres thick. The stone has readable inscriptions and is in comparatively excellent shape despite having withstood the weather over the years.

== Personal life ==
Sultan Omar Ali Saifuddin was married three times, three out of his four wives were Sultan Husin Kamaluddin's daughters; Pengiran Anak Putri, Pengiran Anak Nur Alam, Pengiran Istri Bongsu and Wan Puteh. Known children of Omar Ali were:

- Sultan Muhammad Tajuddin
- Sultan Muhammad Kanzul Alam
- Pangiran Anak Abdul Wahab
- Pangiran Anak Sulaiman
- Pangiran Anak Usuf
- Pengiran Muhammad Ayub

Regnal titles
Preceded by Husin Kamaluddin	Sultan of Brunei; 1740–1795	Succeeded by Muhammad Tajuddin
