= Muhammad Alam =

Sultan of Brunei from 1826 to 1828

Muhammad Alam محمد عالم

Sultan of Brunei
- Reign: 1826–1828
- Predecessor: Muhammad Kanzul Alam
- Successor: Omar Ali Saifuddin II
- Died: c. 1828; Pulau Chermin, Brunei–Muara, Brunei
- Burial: Pulau Chermin, Brunei–Muara, Brunei (Allegedly)
- House: Digadong
- Father: Muhammad Kanzul Alam
- Mother: Pengiran Anak Salamah
- Religion: Islam

Muhammad Alam ibnu Muhammad Kanzul Alam (died c. 1828) was the self-proclaimed 22nd sultan of Brunei from 1826 to 1828, the year he is alleged to have died. Due to his tough and strict attitude, he was given the Malay nicknames Raja Api (King of Fire) and Sultan Marak Berapi. Despite being perceived as a fragile and progressively protective kingdom, Brunei managed to hold onto its lands under his rule, which stretched from Tanjong Datu in Sarawak to Kimanis in Sabah.

His rise to power as the Sultan was disliked by most of the population of Brunei and ignored royal Bruneian tradition which led to the second civil war between him and his successor, Pengiran Muda Omar Ali Saifuddin. Muhammad Alam may have briefly assumed the title of Sultan because he portrays Sultan Muhammad Alam, who ruled from 1826 to 1828, in the 1986 family tree. When a second civil war broke out between him and Raja Noor Alam in the period between 1826 and 1828, the Bruneian royals once more had a harsh ordeal.

== Personal life ==
Pengiran Muda (Prince) Muhammad Alam @ Mutalam ibnu Sultan Muhammad Kanzul Alam is oldest son of Pengiran Digadong Ayah Pengiran Muda Muhammad Kanzul Alam ibnu Sultan Omar Ali Saifuddin I. His father's second wife, Pengiran Anak Salamah Ibnu Pengiran Seri Rama, was his mother. Since his father was Sultan Muhammad Tajuddin's half-brother, Muhammad Alam is a nephew of Sultan Muhammad Tajuddin ibnu Sultan Omar Ali Saifuddien. His most prominent half-sister from his father's first marriage to Pengiran Anak Saleha, is Raja Isteri Noralam, the eldest daughter of the aforementioned Sultan. His brothers are Pengiran Muda Hashim and Pengiran Badaruddin.

== Early life ==
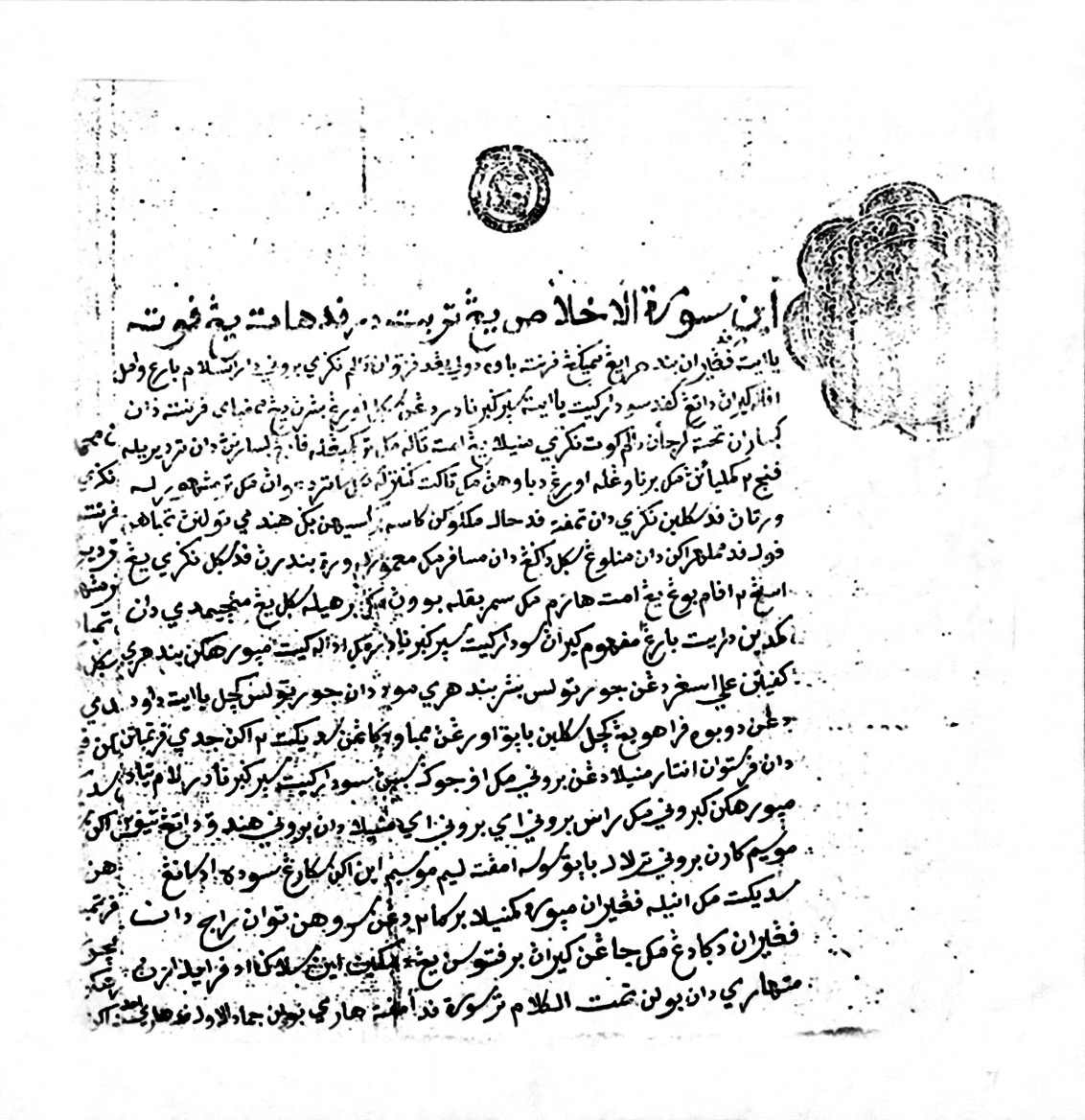
Letter from Muhammad Alam to the Spanish Governor General in Manila

Muhammad Alam became well-known both domestically and globally during the reign of his father. He and his father had considerable economic influence, as shown by their direct communication about commercial issues in Brunei with William Farquhar. Muhammad Alam, despite his wealth, respected his father's power by submitting to him to reply to Farquhar's correspondence, demonstrating submission to the ruling Sultan. According to Annabel's analysis, his cooperative relationship with his father highlights his influential yet submissive role within the royal court. Muhammad Kanzul Alam referred to him as "our friend" (sahabat kita) instead of "our son" (anakanda kita), suggesting that he held significant authority in his father's administration.

A British officer came in Brunei during the 1809 incident known as the challenge of Si Merah. He disobeyed royal custom by going straight to Muhammad Alam rather than through the Sultan. Tensions increased when he physically intervened during the Lapau audience, throwing the lieutenant several feet away, even though it was made clear where he was seated. Local accounts claim that this action was taken in retaliation for Si Merah's challenge concerning a hunting dog named "Commerce," which was supposed to represent his ambition to take territory from Brunei. His resolute reply was interpreted as a protecting of Brunei's interests against colonialism and a defence of his father's dignity.

Sharif Hasan Al Habsi of Hadhramaut, who claimed he could take Brunei in half a day, challenged Muhammad Alam, once again demonstrating his importance in maintaining Brunei's sovereignty. he challenged Al Habsi in Ujung Sapoh Muara Besar with the help of his siblings and the local leaders. Al Habsi gave in after seeing his tenacity, asked the Sultan and Muhammad Alam for forgiveness, and was pardoned despite his prior threat. At times, it seemed as though he had more sway than his father, Sultan Muhammad Kanzul Alam.

Throughout the 19th century, piracy was growing in Borneo's coastal cities and ports, seriously endangering trade routes and the stability of the area. In response, the British Government dispatched Captain Robert C. Garnham to enforce a blockade of Bornean ports, with the exception of Pontianak, Banjarmasin, and Brunei. The aim of this action was to reduce piracy and concentrate commerce. Garnham and other foreign envoys thought Muhammad Alam was harsh and irritable, and he resisted them during their assignment. Garnham asked his father's aid in 1813 by constructing authorised ports at the three locations. Muhammad Alam's observant demeanour at an audience ceremony made Garnham anxious, so he hurriedly wrapped up his business.

Muhammad Alam seems to have had a great deal of authority and control over his father's administration; it's possible that he even took on the position of Deputy Sultan before to his father's death. There are indications that he assumed greater responsibility and power in ruling Brunei at this time, including his father's sickness in 1826 and the Sultan accepting a Dutch ambassador in substitution of the Sultan in 1823. His father granted his desire to take the throne, but he kept symbolic objects like the crown and the Kris Si Naga, preserving a division of power between them.

Muhammad Alam's character is further shown by the "Spiers Incident," as H. R. Hughes-Hallett has noted. This incident happened because Captain Spiers treated Muhammad Alam more like a fellow trader than a member of the royal family, which was disrespectful. Due to Captain Spiers' egotistical behavior, which included departing Brunei before the scheduled trading time of 2 pm, the Prince asked his father to find out if Brunei was being played with by the British. The Sultan replied with a forceful statement calling on foreign commerce to 'behave,' but Farquhar settled the dispute by directing Captain Spiers to report for disciplinary action to the British Government in Bengal.

== Reign ==
=== Succession dispute ===
Muhammad Alam felt assured of his imminent rule upon receiving his father's approval, despite lacking the symbolic crown and Kris Si Naga that traditionally signify full Sultanate power. However, his accession was met with disapproval among the Bruneian populace. In contrast to fifteen years earlier, when his father took power with the heir apparent still a minor, Pengiran Muda Omar Ali Saifuddin had matured into a capable young man widely recognised as suitable to ascend the throne. Muhammad Alam's support base was largely confined to his commercial associates within Brunei, as his authoritarian tendencies deepened the rift between him and his subjects, fostering widespread hostility toward his reign. Despite historical portrayals of him as a formidable leader during his father's rule, admired for his stern demeanor that at times protected Brunei from foreign deception, his actions also alienated foreign envoys and exacerbated internal discontent, ultimately isolating him as the most despised and feared figure in the empire.

This dispute began when Muhammad Alam chose to assume the throne instead of Pengiran Muda Omar Ali Saifuddin, who was the legitimate successor. This conflict had its origins in 1804, when Sultan Muhammad Tajuddin abdicated in favour of his son, Sultan Muhammad Jamalul Alam. Sultan Muhammad Tajuddin died soon after, leaving Pengiran Muda Omar Ali Saifuddien, his baby son, as the presumed heir. After resuming the throne for his grandchildren, Sultan Muhammad Tajuddin sought Pengiran Digadong Ayah's regency in 1806, pledging to pick advisers for Pengiran Muda Omar Ali until he reached adulthood. This was owing to Tajuddin's deteriorating health. Pengiran Digadong Ayah, however, broke the terms of the treaty when he proclaimed himself Sultan in 1807 upon the death of Sultan Muhammad Tajuddin. He ruled with his son, Muhammad Alam, until his own passing in 1826. When Sultan Muhammad Kanzul Alam died, he chose Muhammad Alam as his successor, even though he did not wear the royal regalia that denotes absolute authority. This created a public dispute between Muhammad Alam and Omar Ali Saifuddien II's followers.

=== Civil war ===
There seems to be historical background to a civil war that broke out in Brunei in the years after his father's death, around 1826–1828. Pengiran Muda Omar Ali Saifuddien and his allies moved to Keingaran Island on 15 February 1826, potentially declaring themselves Sultans and constructing a defensive posture, about this time, out of concern for their safety. Fears about Muhammad Alam's tyranny during the civil war, including reports that he required blood rituals to remain unstoppable, may have led to the migration. This might be seen as Muhammad Alam used brutality and hostage-taking to intimidate followers of Sultan Omar Ali Saifuddin II, so solidifying his image as the ruthless Raja Api.

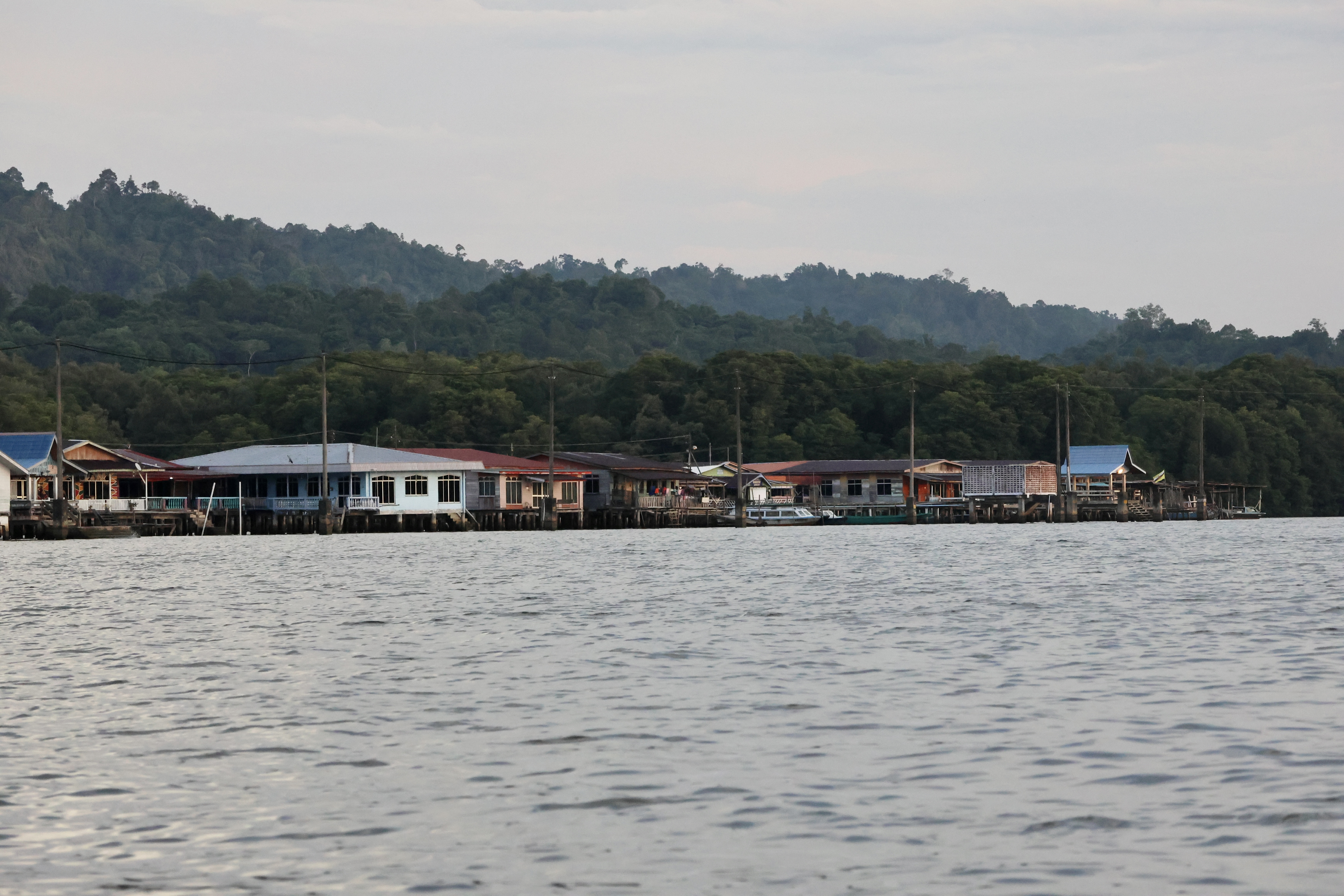
Kampong Burong Pingai Ayer on 27 May 2023

The people of Brunei, especially those in Kampong Burong Pingai (present day Kampong Burong Pingai Ayer) and the adjacent districts, were mostly in favour of Omar Ali Saifuddin II. The uprising against Muhammad Alam, headed by Pehin Dato Perdana Menteri Abdul Hak, was motivated by their conviction that Omar Ali Saifuddien had a legitimate claim to the throne. Kampong Burong Pingai was renowned for its highly educated population, which included religious academics who adhered to Islamic doctrines and values of justice. This helped explain why these individuals supported Omar Ali Saifuddien. In the past, they supported Pengiran Muda Muhammad Yusof and Muhammad Alam by their active trading, which benefited Brunei's economy. But the villagers turned against him once he took over, banding up with Omar Ali Saifuddien's followers on Keingaran Island to erect blockades against his rule. His support, on the other hand, was restricted to his close associates and family, highlighting the fact that his harsh and despotic rule cost him the favour of the general public.

=== Death and aftermath ===
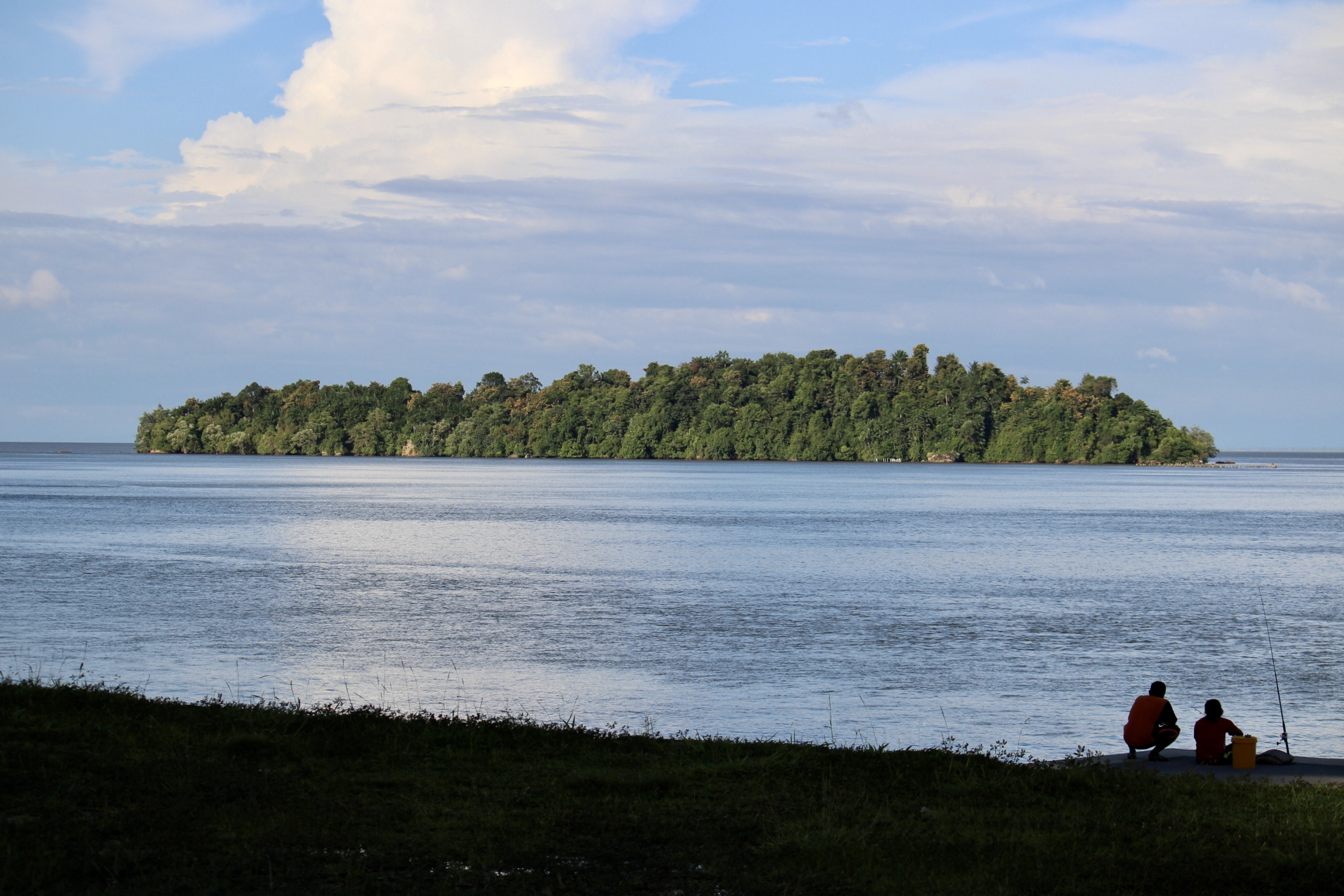
Chermin Island in May 2022

Though there are differing reports of how this happened, Muhammad Alam's death in 1828 marked the end of Brunei's civil war. According to the commonly accepted story, Muhammad Alam was on Chermin Island when assassins were sent to assassinate him. Raja Isteri Nooralam was the mother of Sultan Omar Ali Saifuddien II and the half-sister of Muhammad Alam. Recognising the seriousness of their mission, these killers went up to him. To their surprise, he collaborated, giving them advice on how to overcome his seeming invincibility before they buried and garrotted him on the island. However, because of his well-known anger and the absence of eyewitness testimony, historian Pehin Jamil challenges this story.

An alternative interpretation of the end of Muhammad Alam's reign is provided by the second narrative. In this version, he willingly departed Brunei after admitting defeat, rather than being assassinated by assassins. It is said that he moved to Putatan in Sabah to have a simpler life. The Brunei History Centre's 2009 investigation, which located a gravestone in Putatan believed to be that of Muhammad Alam, gives credibility to this narrative. While no concrete proof of his burial on Chermin Island or in the Royal Mausoleum has been discovered, the center pointed out that the gravestone is comparable to royal tombstones discovered in Brunei.

A chronology of the events surrounding Muhammad Alam's reign shows political unrest and succession conflicts in Brunei, which is necessary to determine whether or not they qualify as a civil war. Important sources that provide light on internal unrest, factional battles, and challenges to legitimacy during this time include local chronicles and academic assessments by individuals such as Pehin Jamil. The mentioned indicators suggest notable internal divides and violent conflicts over leadership, which correspond with the characteristics commonly linked to civil wars. However, more examination of historical records is necessary to draw a firm conclusion. Muhammad Alam's brother Pengiran Muda Hashim, who took part in the abortive insurrection in the 1820s, said that his downfall marked the end of a stable, although rigorous, system of governance in Brunei. The demise's siblings and other relatives, scattered, with some migrating to Sarawak.

== Reputation ==
European sources, like the works of Stamford Raffles and Farquhar, support the native narratives and offer further viewpoints in spite of the possibility of hearsay and second-hand knowledge. The direct and objective literature from Europe stand in stark contrast to the subjective sources from the local area. Muhammad Alam's harsh character, characterised by suspicion towards foreign envoys and a self-imposed role as the protector of Brunei and its royal court, is revealed by Annabel Teh Gallop's extensive study of British accounts during his father's reign. This explains his cold and harsh treatment of many foreign envoys.

In addition to written records, Muhammad Alam is portrayed as a tyrant known as Raja Api or Sultan Marak Berapi in widely accepted traditional legend. Noting that the folklore has components with the 'Silsilah Raja-Raja Brunei' and European narratives despite considerable changes over time, historians like Pehin Jamil and Yura Halim have used these stories to back up their views about the period. The mythological legend, which is abundant, describes him as possessing extraordinary powers, such as the ability to breathe fire when enraged and to fly in search of blood to gain invincibility. This suggests that the local populace saw him as frightening and worrisome.

Muhammad Alam, often known as is negatively portrayed more because of his reputation as a harsh and unforgiving leader than because of his actual skills. This term implies that his cruel monarchy caused pain for his citizens, a reference to Malay practices of quietly criticizing unpopular kings. Furthermore, the comparisons to mythical individuals such as Raja Bersiong underscore the significance of folklore in depicting him with otherworldly qualities, including flight and an appetite for human blood, which function as metaphoric accusations of his purported misuse of authority and severe rule.

Muhammad Alam's traits include being serious and harsh in all of his interactions, as well as frequently refusing to comply with orders or show disrespect. These traits may have contributed to his intolerance throughout his rule. He may also be described as having total intolerance for everything that does not go his way. His acts in several accounts may be analysed to show that he has a monopolistic nature, which is somewhat accurate.

Regnal titles
Preceded by Muhammad Kanzul Alam	Sultan of Brunei; 1826–1828	Succeeded by Omar Ali Saifuddin II
