= Omar Ali Saifuddin II =

Sultan of Brunei from 1828 to 1852

Omar Ali Saifuddin II عمر علي سيف الدين٢
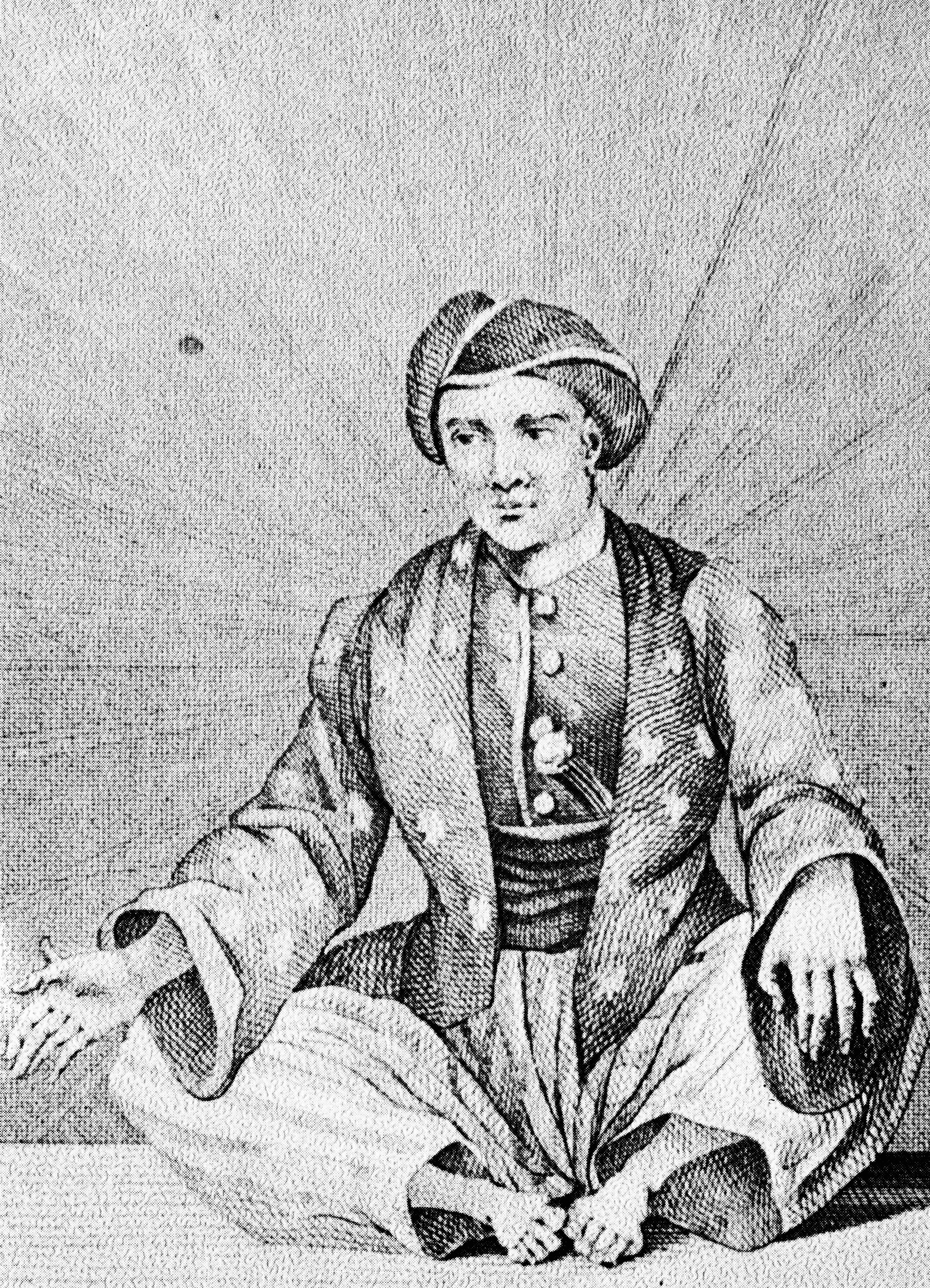
- Illustration of Omar Ali Saifuddin

Sultan of Brunei
- Reign: 1828–1852
- Predecessor: Muhammad Alam
- Successor: Abdul Momin
- Died: 18 November 1852
- Burial: Royal Mausoleum, Bandar Seri Begawan, Brunei
- Spouse: Tuan Zaidah
- Issue: List: Hashim Jalilul Alam Aqamaddin; Prince Muhammad Salleh I; Prince Muhammad Alam; Prince Abdul Momin; Prince Hashim; Queen Zubaidah; Princess Siti Mariam; Princess Saleha; Princess Siti Munggu; Princess Khadijah; Princess Pasah
- House: Bolkiah
- Father: Muhammad Jamalul Alam I
- Mother: Raja Isteri Noralam
- Religion: Islam

Omar Ali Saifuddin II (died 18 November 1852) was the 23rd Sultan of Brunei from 1828 until his death in 1852. During his reign, Western powers such as the United Kingdom and the United States visited the country. His reign saw the British adventurer James Brooke becoming the White Rajah of Sarawak.

== Early life ==
When his father, Sultan Muhammad Jamalul Alam I, died in 1804, he was still a minor followed by a physical deformity of an extra thumb on his right hand. Therefore, his grandfather, Paduka Seri Bega'wan Muhammad Tajuddin ascended the throne for the second time. Due to the advanced age of Sultan Muhammad Tajuddin, his younger brother, Pengiran Di-Gadong Pengiran Muda Muhammad Kanzul Alam acted as regent. When Muhammad Tajuddin died in 1807, the regent became the sultan of Brunei and was known as Sultan Muhammad Kanzul Alam. Kanzul Alam then appointed his own son, Pengiran Muda Muhammad Alam as heir to the throne of Brunei.

In 1825, when Pengiran Muda Omar Ali Saifuddin had come of age, he asserted his claim to the throne. Pengiran Muda Omar Ali Saifuddin was supported by most nobles as he was the rightful heir according to Brunei's royal traditions. The Kris Si Naga was in the possession of his mother, thus strengthened his claim. To end the succession crisis, Muhammad Alam stepped down from the throne and was sentenced to death. In 1828, Pengiran Muda Omar Ali Saifuddin ascended the throne as the 23rd Sultan of Brunei, taking the title Sultan Omar Ali Saifuddin II.

== Reign ==
=== Accession and struggle for Kuching ===
After his succession to the throne, he appointed his uncle Pengiran Muda Hashim as the Bendahara (Prime Minister) as a sign of compassion to heal their family relations after the Second Civil War. Pengiran Bendahara Pengiran Muda Hashim was also the late Sultan Muhammad Alam and Queen Noralam's brother.

During Sultan Omar Ali Saifuddin II's reign, he tried to establish absolute control over the economic importance of Kuching. Before this, only the Pengirans who acted on behalf of the Sultan, were in charge of collecting taxes and revenues from the local people. Especially after the discovery of antimony ore in Kuching, the Sultan became more ambitious in gaining control of Kuching's economy. The Governor of Sarawak at that time, Pengiran Indera Mahkota, also used forced labour to run the antimony mines. A disturbance occurred in Sarawak where an uprising against Brunei rule led by Datu Patinggi Ali, who was one of the ruling chiefs in Kuching. Due to the worsened situation in Sarawak, Pengiran Muda Hashim was ordered to restore order in the area.

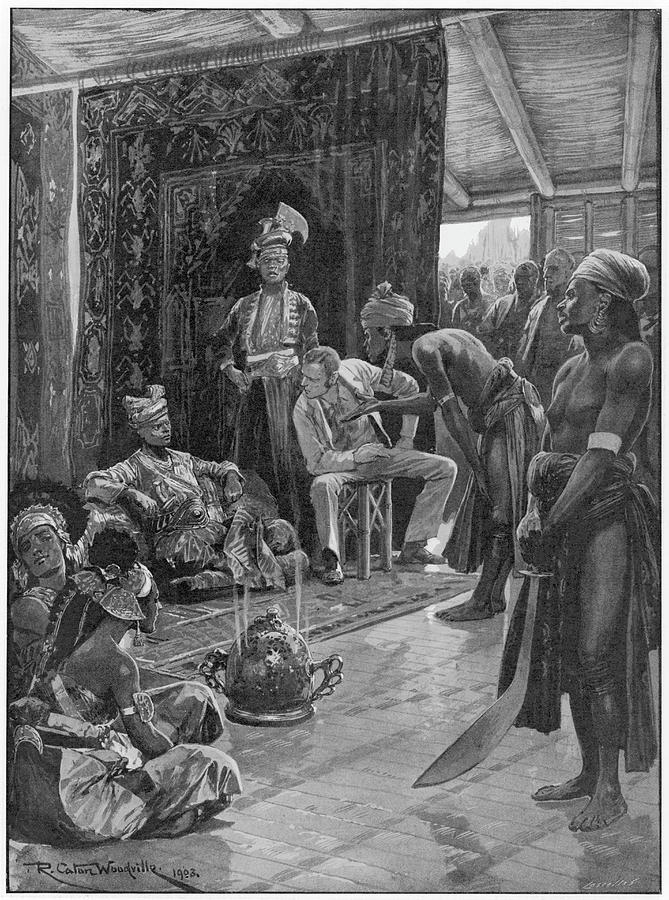
Muda Hashim negotiating with James Brooke.

=== Pengiran Muda Hashim and James Brooke ===
At the time of chaotic situation in Kuching, a British explorer, James Brooke, came on his schooner Royalist looking for trade opportunities in 1839. Brooke came to Kuching from Singapore as he had heard about Kuching's economic potentials. Also, at this time, Brooke met Pengiran Muda Hashim, who was the uncle of Omar Ali Saifuddin, and the two became close friends. Pengiran Muda Hashim asked for Brooke's assistance to help him to suppress the disturbances in Kuching, in return, Pengiran Muda Hashim ensured the appointment of Brooke as the new Governor, after the Governor Raja Pengiran Indera Mahkota had been deposed.

Muda Hashim later appointed James as the temporary governor in 1841 and in 1842, he sailed to Brunei to be given the title of Tuan Besar (Great Lord) and again appointed as the representative in charge of affairs in Old Sarawak by the Sultan. After the disturbances in Sarawak successfully quelled, Brooke met Pengiran Muda Hashim in Kuching to ensure his promises were kept. Pengiran Muda Hashim agreed to honour his promise. In 1842, Omar Ali Saifuddin reluctantly confirmed the appointment of James Brooke as the Governor of Sarawak in a treaty. The treaty officially recognised James Brooke as the Raja of Sarawak and the Sultan had to cede Kuching to James Brooke.

For a yearly payment of $2,500, Brooke obtained the rich in antimony region of Sarawak in July 1842. This meant that Brooke seized control of half of Brunei during this period. Following Sarawak's formal transfer to him in 1847 from Omar Ali Saifuddin, Brooke extended its boundaries (from one location to another), typically at Brunei's cost. The cession of Kuching to Brooke marked the beginning of further cessation of territories to the Brooke family and later, the British North Borneo Company (BNBC).

The rapid loss of Brunei's territories caused severe economic weakness. Because of Britain's colonial policies, which limited Britain's intervention, Brooke was able to extend its territory and cause Brunei to lose its land. Since Britain could exert indirect authority over new territories that were strategically and financially significant to them, they did not object at this time to private initiatives by British residents or trade corporations under their sponsorship to own towns in Northern Borneo.

=== Treaty of Labuan and death ===
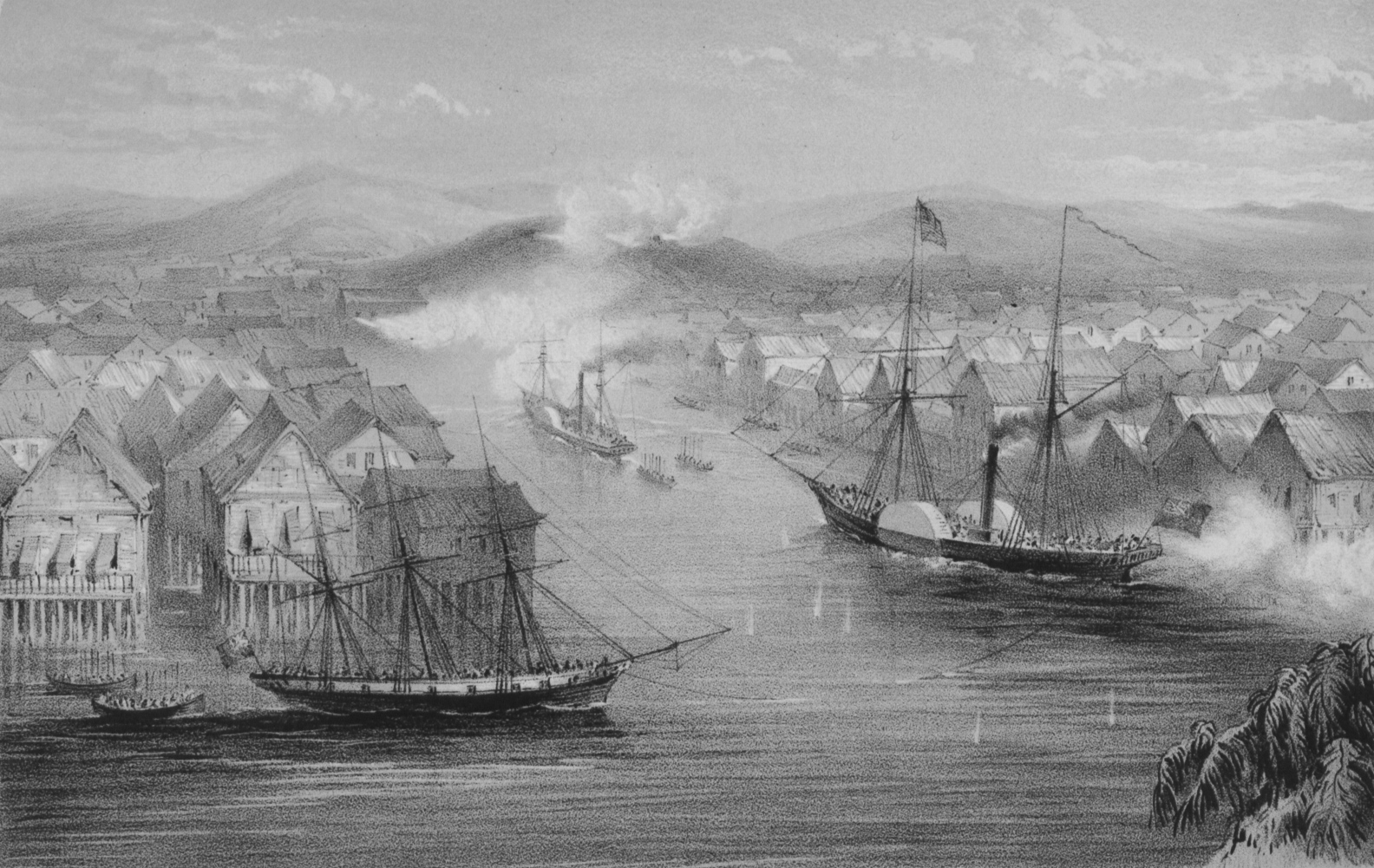
HEICS Phlegethon, HMS Spiteful, and HMS Royalist (1841) attack and capture of Brunei on 8 July 1846

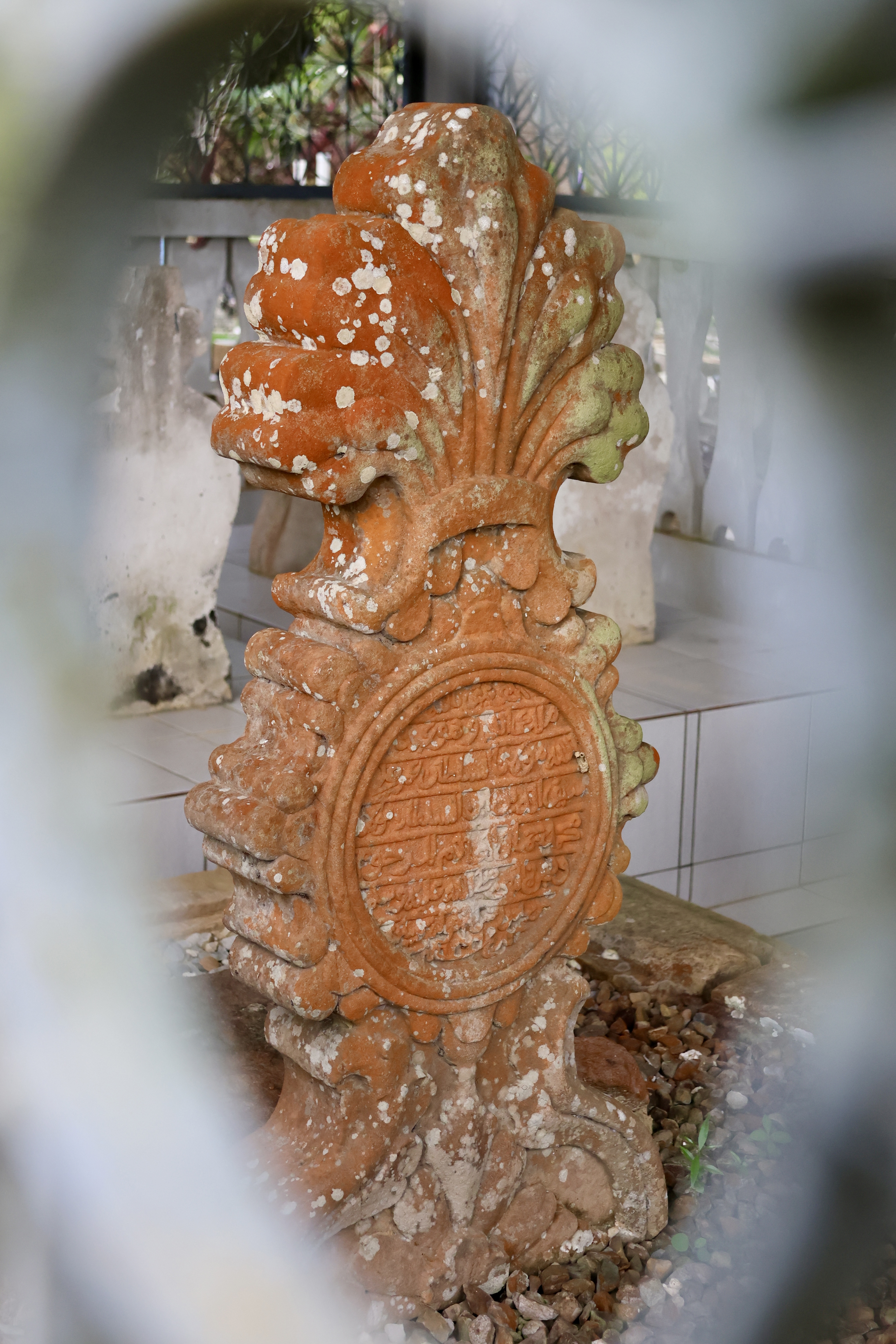
Tombstone of Omar Ali

In October 1843, the Sultan offered the island of Labuan to Britain. Notably on 6 April 1845, the relations between Brunei and the United States first began when the warship USS Constitution visited and anchored off Brunei Bay. In July 1846, James Brooke and Admiral Sir Thomas Cochrane together began a naval attack on Brunei Town and depose the Sultan. The Sultan reluctantly pledged loyalty towards Queen Victoria after he was reinstated.

That same year on 18 December, Omar Ali Saifuddin was forced to cede Labuan to the British Government under the Treaty of Labuan after threats of attack made by the Royal Navy. In 1847, the Sultan signed the Treaty of Friendship and Commerce with Britain which provide them with full control over Brunei's trade, and on 23 June 1850, he signed the Treaty of Peace, Friendship, Commerce and Navigation with the United States.

Due to significant foreign pressure on him, towards the end on his life, Omar Ali Saifuddin's health began rapidly deteriorating. He chose to distance himself from ruling the state but he never abdicated the throne. At the moment, his son-in-law Abdul Momin was appointed a regent. Omar Ali Saifuddin II died in 1852 and was succeeded by his son-in-law, Sultan Abdul Momin as the 24th Sultan of Brunei. Abdul Momin's succession was regarded as a temporary fill-in on the throne before Temenggong Hashim, the son of the late Sultan would succeed to the throne in 1885. He was buried at the Royal Mausoleum, Bandar Seri Begawan.

== Legacy ==
=== Reputation ===
By all accounts, Sultan Omar Ali Saifuddin II was an unimpressive figure with a second thumb on his right hand and a dull mind. He owed his position to the ambition and political savvy of his mother rather than to any personal talents. He is sometimes referred to as a fool by Western observers, but it's more likely that he was simply not particularly intelligent, making him a target of plots and a tool of his advisers, whoever they happened to be at the moment. He was never officially installed as the Sultan of Brunei and hence remained a sort of "acting sultan" due to his weakness and the persistence of the disagreements among Brunei's governing class. The solemnisation of other ranking posts was also limited. Because the nominal leadership lacked the moral and traditional power conferred by the ceremonies involved with the complete coronation and installation, the overall impact was to weaken the government of Brunei.

Regnal titles
Preceded by Muhammad Alam	Sultan of Brunei; 1829–1852	Succeeded by Abdul Momin
