= Terusan =

Terusan Trusan
- Village
- Location in Sabah, Malaysia
- Coordinates: 6°26′0″N 117°41′0″E
- Country: Malaysia
- State: Sabah
- Elevation: 0 m (0 ft)
- Time zone: UTC+8 (MST)

Terusan (also known as Trusan or Terusan Sugut) is a settlement in Sabah, Malaysia. It is about three feet above sea level, and the approximate population within a seven-kilometer radius was 818 as of 2004.

Nearby towns and villages include Jambongan (17.6 nm north), Tagahan (6.3 nm south), Boaan (24.6 nm east), Si Kub (56.8 nm east), and Suba Talan (2.2 nm west).
