= Anglo-Brunei Treaty of Friendship (1847) =

Anglo-Brunei Treaty of Friendship and Commerce
Treaty of Friendship and Commerce between Her Majesty and the Sultan of Borneo
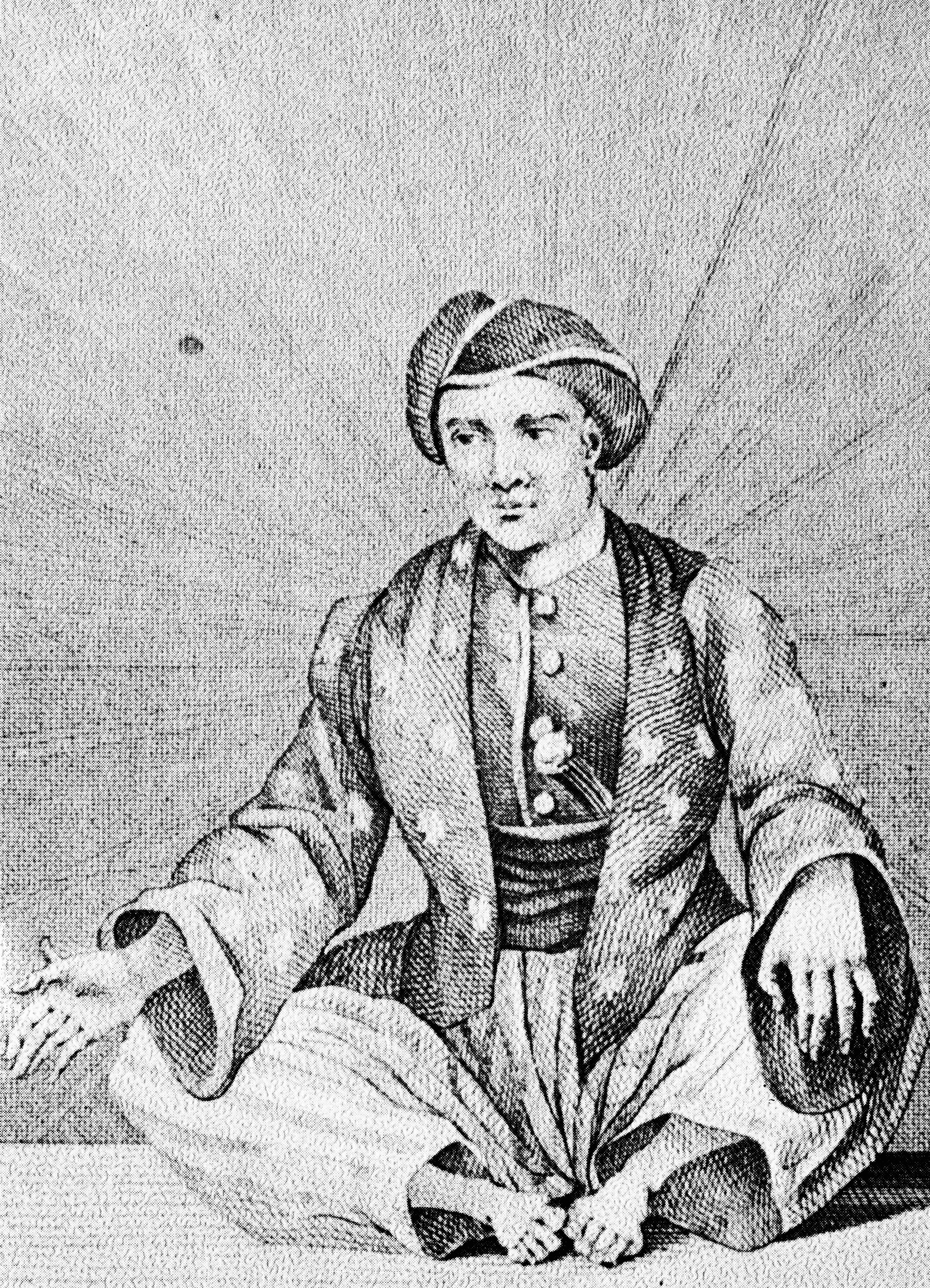
- Illustration of Sultan Omar Ali Saifuddin II
- Type: Commerce, Suppression, Territorial cession
- Signed: 27 May 1847; 179 years ago
- Location: Brunei
- Original signatories: Sultan Omar Ali Saifuddin II; James Brooke
- Parties: Sultanate of Brunei; United Kingdom
- Language: English

The Treaty of Friendship and Commerce between Her Majesty and the Sultan of Borneo or the Anglo-Brunei Treaty of Friendship 1847 was a treaty signed on 27 May 1847 between the Sultanate of Brunei and the British Empire. The treaty aimed to encourage commerce between Britain and Brunei, as well as to end the rampant piracy in the region. The treaty also saw the official cession of Labuan to Britain, which was handed over prior to the treaty. The treaty prohibited Brunei from ceding further land to other nations without British consent, effectively conceding to the British Government. This provision put Britain in the role of protector, which would later become an issue for James Brooke's expansionist ambitions.

The treaty was signed by the 23rd Sultan of Brunei, Sultan Omar Ali Saifuddin II and then Commissioner and Consul-General of Brunei and Independent Chiefs of Borneo, James Brooke.

== Content ==
The treaty consists of a preamble, 12 articles and an additional article. The additional article was signed by the signatories with the rest of the treaty.

The terms of the treaty are set out as follows:

- The preamble sets out that Britain seeks to encourage commerce between Brunei and Britain. As well as suppressing piracy which had disrupted commerce up to that point. It also establishes the Sultan's consent and cooperation to the terms.
- Article I concerned peace and friendship, whereby the British Government and the Brunei Government would have good relations "for ever".
- Article II concerned trade rights, where British and Brunei subjects will have the freedom to "enter into, reside in, trade with, and pass with their merchandize" in both territories.
- Article III concerned property ownership for British subjects. Where they will have the right to "purchase, rent, or occupy, or...acquire, all kinds of property" in Brunei. British subjects would also "enjoy full and complete protection...for themselves and for any property".
- Article IV establishes free trade between Brunei and Britain. Where "no article whatever shall be prohibited from being imported into or exported" from Brunei" and that trade "shall be perfectly free" subject to customs duties.
- Article V limits the rate of duties that can be on British vessels. Brunei cannot impose a duty that exceeds "one dollar per registered ton". It also establishes that British trade and goods "shall be exempt from any internal duties, and also from any injurious regulations".
- Article VI establishes that no export duties can be levied on exports from Brunei. It specifies that no duty can be imposed on "any article, the growth, produce, or manufacture" in the Sultan's dominion.
- Article VII establishes that Brunei will permit British warships and East Indian warships to freely enter into Brunei waters. It also establishes that the ships will have the right to "provide themselves...with such supplies, stores and provisions" that may be in need of.
- Article VIII establishes that in the event of a British wreck in Brunei territory, Brunei is obliged to provide assistance and to provide full protection to the crew and the property.
- Article IX establishes that both Brunei and Britain will engage in the suppression of piracy in Brunei waters. It prohibits the Brunei Government from providing protection to any person engaged in pirate activities and bans the sale of merchandise acquired through piracy. It also provides Britain with the right to enter Brunei waters "at all times" to capture all pirate vessels.
- Article X confirms the cession of Labuan. It provided that Labuan was to be "possessed in perpetuity and in full sovereignty" by the British Government. It also establishes that Brunei cannot "make any similar cession" to "any other nation" without British consent.
- Article XI abolishes the trade of slaves. The Brunei Government is to suppress all trade in slaves and to prohibit engagement in slavery. It also gave Britain the right to engage with force any vessel engaged in the slave trade.
- Article XII establishes that the treaty will be ratified in Brunei within 12 months after 27 May 1847.
- The additional article establishes that all legal cases concerning a British subject will be tried and judged by the English Consul-General or other officer of Britain. This absolute legal jurisdiction equally applies when it is between a British subject and a Brunei subject.

== History ==
=== Background ===
The treaty of friendship was a byproduct of James Brooke's attack on the capital of Brunei. The attack was done in retaliation for the assassination of Pengiran Muda Hashim, which was by order of Sultan Omar Ali Saifuddin II. In 1845, Brooke with the aid of Admiral Thomas Cochrane descended upon the capital and after some fighting, had put the Brunei batteries "out of action" and had taken the capital. The Sultan had fled and was unable to be found by the British forces. The Sultan was later reinstated by the British, following Cochrane's worries of anarchy and Brooke's acceptance of his return.

The Sultan upon his return was induced by Brooke to do "penance at the grave of his murdered uncles, wrote a letter of apology to Queen Victoria, confirmed Brooke in his possession of Sarawak". The Sultan also offered to cede Labuan to the British and it was accepted. This acceptance was a result of British desire to counter the policy of the Dutch and to secure trade in the region. The Colonial Office concluded that "sound policy sanctions the formation of the settlement at Labuan".

On 18 December 1845, Captain Rodney Mundy with cannons pointed towards the royal palace, signed a treaty with the Sultan. The signage confirmed the cession of Labuan and gave permission to suppress piracy in Brunei waters. Pengiran Abdul Momin, the future sultan of Brunei was taken to Labuan to witness its accession to Britain on 24 December These events and agreements were then assimilated into the 1847 treaty.

=== Debates and motivations in drafting ===
As the treaty with Brunei was intended as a challenge to the Dutch pressence in the region, and the 1824 Treaty of London, the Foreign Office consulted other branches of the British Administration for advice in what to include in the articles.

The Colonial Office suggested that "no stipulations bearing particularly upon the interests of Her Majesty's Colonies" and the Admiralty proposed an article to provide "free admission of British Ships of War". Aspects of these suggestions would take the form of Article VII and Article V respectively. The Board of Trade proposed that "Britain should trade on the most-favoured nation principle" with a moderate import tariff. They also suggested that export duties to be ruled out and that Labuan was to be guaranteed in perpetuity. This suggestion survived in Articles III to VI. Some of the departments gave conflicting advice to the Foreign Office. For example, the East Indian Company's Secret Committee "even seemed to conflict with themselves". It wanted no stipultions to "protect the life and property of British settlers out of jurisdiction" but wanted "the exclusive right of settlement where the right of working minerals have been secured".

The final draft was mostly based on the Board of Trade's submission. It included the Board's recommendation on customs duties, and article IV insisted that trade should be free apart from them. It also included more of the Admiralty's suggestions in article IX and XI. However, the final draft would again be amended by James Brooke. Who was appointed by the Foreign Office with a new title, that being Commissioner and Consul-General to the Sultan and Independent Chiefs of Borneo. With his new authority Brooke would omit and alter articles in the treaty. For example, he replaced the import duty on British vessels to a fixed duty of one dollar per ton as well as excluding the Secret Committee's article on flags. The Foreign Office would approve Brooke's decisions and did not confine any further.

Brooke's appointment also served as a challenge to the Dutch influence. The Foreign Office explained to Brooke that his position was required to protect British commerce from "encroachment of the Netherlands authorities".

=== Aftermath ===
As a matter of diplomatic practice, the treaty would become a model for other treaties in the region. In terms of foreign policy, the treaty would calcify British presence in Borneo and pose a counterbalance to the Dutch presence in the South of Borneo. It would also become a thorn on James Brooke's expansionist ambitions for Sarawak, mainly owing to Article X, which put Brunei under de facto protection by the British Empire. Brooke, who desired reformation of Brunei, would establish control over territories, slowly consuming Brunei land. His activities in tandem with his position as independent ruler of Sarawak and his role as Consul General in Brunei became a topic of scrutiny in London. One such critic, Joseph Hume questioned the legitimacy of Brooke's actions:

Who gave Sir James Brooke a right to establish forts in the Territories of the neighbouring tribes? Was it in his capacity of Ruler of Sarawak? Or in the exercise of his functions as British Commissioner and Consul General- had he authority to do any such thing?

— Joseph Hume, 1853

== See also ==
- History of Brunei
- Treaty of Labuan
- Protectorate Agreement of Brunei (1888)
- Report on Brunei
- Sultanate of Brunei
