= History of Brunei =

The history of Brunei concerns the settlements and societies located on the north coast of the island of Borneo, which has been under the influence of Indianised kingdoms and empires for much of its history. Local scholars assume that the Islamisation of Brunei started in the fifteenth century with the formation of the Bruneian Empire, a thalassocracy that covered the northern part of Borneo and Sulu. At the end of the 17th century, Brunei entered a period of decline brought on by the Brunei Civil War, piracy, and European colonial expansion. Later, there was the brief Castilian war with Spain, in which Brunei evacuated its capital for a brief period until the Spanish withdrew. The empire lost much of its territory with the arrival of the Western powers, such as the Spanish in Luzon and Visayas and the British in Labuan, Sarawak, and North Borneo. The decline of the Bruneian Empire accelerated in the nineteenth century when Brunei gave much of its territory to the White Rajahs of Sarawak, resulting in the empire's separation into two parts. Sultan Hashim Jalilul Alam Aqamaddin later appealed to the British to stop further annexation in 1888. In the same year, the British signed a "Treaty of Protection" that made Brunei a British protectorate until 1984 when it gained independence and prospered due to the discovery of oil.

== Prehistory ==
The earliest record of Bruneian people can be traced back to the presence of Austro-Melanesians around 40,000 B.C.E. in the Niah Cave, Sarawak. The remains found there were linked to those found in the Last Glacial Period. During the ice age, Borneo and Palawan were geographically linked.

After the sea level rose about 10,000 years ago, Southeast Asian territories were divided into two regions. (Note: peninsular S.E. Asia and maritime or Nusantarian S.E. Asia) The population there began to move around for various reasons. Hoabinhians, or Proto-Melanesians, then moved to Borneo and lived in Niah Cave until around 8,000 B.C.E.

The migration from Yangtze started to move toward Taiwan. Then, after Taiwan, the migration wave reached the Philippines via Palawan. After the migration wave reached Palawan, at least three groups began to form distinct communities. One group migrated toward Borneo, another group headed to Sulawesi, and the last moved to Java. The event lasted about a thousand years, between 4000 and 3000 BCE. The migration at this time signified the end of the bacsonian age. Neolithic usage of pottery and cultivation of rice reached the Austronesians via the Philippines around 2500 B.C.E. It reached Palawan, then went to Borneo around 2300 BCE and spread across Insulindia.

The Austronesians began to develop a faith or cosmology around megalithism and then started to build social structure and practice agriculture as people settled down and tried to cultivate the land. This Bronze Age cultural complex peaked around 600 B.C.E., centred in Dong Son village, thus called Dongsonian. The introduction of iron and bronze between 500 and 200 B.C.E. marked the end of Neolithic cults and the start of Indian contact in southeast Asia. The Indian trade brought beads of glass or stone to Borneo.

== Pre-Islamic Hindu–Buddhist Indianised kingdoms ==
Historic Indosphere cultural influence zone of Greater India for transmission of elements of Indian culture such as the honorific titles, naming of people, naming of places, mottos of organisations and educational institutes, as well as the adoption of Hinduism, Buddhism, Indian architecture, martial arts, Indian music and dance, traditional Indian clothing, and Indian cuisine, a process that has been also aided by the ongoing Indian diaspora.

The history of Brunei before the arrival of Magellan's ships in 1519–1522 CE is based on speculation, the interpretation of Chinese sources, and local legends, unless otherwise proven by archaeology.

Camphor and pepper seem to have been prized objects of trade. Brunei hard camphor had a wholesale value equivalent to its weight in silver. Ming dynasty accounts give detailed information about visits and tribute missions by rulers of Po-ni (modern Mandarin pronunciation) during the late 14th and early 15th century. Their names and titles suggest either Hindu or Buddhist influence. The texts confirm that the state was tributary to the Hindu Javanese Majapahit Empire, but sought and received Chinese protection in 1408.

=== Brunei in the legendary history of Panay island ===
Datu Puti led some dissident datus from Borneo in a rebellion against Datu Makatunaw. The dissidents and their retinue established a new country called Madyaas on Panay island. After the 10 datus established many towns in Panay and southern Luzon, Datu Makatunaw, who was a relative of Datu Puti, seized the properties and riches of the datus. Warriors named Labaw Dunggon and Paybari, after learning of this injustice from their father-in-law Paiburong, sailed to Udtuhan in Borneo where Makatunaw ruled. The warriors sacked the town, killed Makatunaw and his family, retrieved the stolen properties of the 10 datus, enslaved the remaining population of Udtuhan, and sailed back to Panay. Labaw Dunggon and his wife, Uhaytanayon, later settled in a place called Muruburo.

== Syair Awang Semaun epic ==
According to the official version of events, mainly the national epic poem Syair Awang Semaun, Brunei was founded by a band of fourteen saudara (brothers and first cousins) who eventually settled along the Brunei River near the present capital and chose one of their numbers as the first ruler. Some versions of the epic state that they were all the sons of Dewa Amas of Kayangan, a partially supernatural being who descended to earth at Ulu Limbang in an egg. Many Lundayeh / Lun Bawang believe that Awang Semaun is their ancestral land because of Telur Aco.

Sang Aji was married to the ruler's daughter by whom he fathered one son. He traveled to thirteen settlements in the region in search of an auspicious ox. At each of the villages, he fathered thirteen (or twenty-two) other sons by thirteen different aboriginal wives, daughters of the local penghulu.

The first ruler chosen by the saudara to rule the newly founded state was Awang Alak Betatar, the son of Dewa Amas and Sang Aji's daughter. He was not necessarily the eldest among them, but he was chosen to rule because of his fitness to do so. The official account states that he journeyed to Johor, embraced Islam, married the daughter of a Sultan "Bahkei" of Johor, and received the title of Sultan Muhammad Shah from him.

== Brunei in the 14th century ==
=== Early Chinese influence ===
One of the earliest Chinese records of an independent kingdom in Borneo is the 977 AD letter to the Chinese emperor from the ruler of Boni, which some scholars believe refers to western Borneo. The Bruneians regained their independence from Srivijaya due to the onset of a Javanese-Sumatran war. In 1225, the Chinese official Zhao Rukuo reported that Boni had 100 warships to protect its trade and that there was great wealth in the kingdom.

According to local legends for which no factual confirmation exists, during the early years of the Ming Dynasty, the Emperor of China allegedly sent two officers named Wang Kong and Ong Sum Ping to get the gemala (glowing orb) of the Dragon which supposedly lived on China Balu where the mountain's name itself refers to the great number of Chinese lives lost, being eaten by the Dragon. It is said that Ong Sum Ping later married Princess Ratna Dewi, the daughter of Sultan Muhammad Shah of Brunei. For that he was conferred with the noble title of Pengiran Maharaja Lela and elected Chief of Kinabatangan.

=== Bruneian conquest of Borneo and the Philippines ===
According to Wang Zhenping, in the 1300s, the Yuan Dade nanhai zhi or "Yuan dynasty Dade period southern sea records" reported that Brunei administered Sarawak and Sabah as well as the Philippine kingdoms of Butuan, Sulu, Ma-i (Mindoro), Malilu (Manila), Shahuchong (Siocon or Zamboanga), Yachen (Oton), and Wenduling (Mindanao), which would later regain their independence.

=== Hindu Majapahit invasion of Borneo ===
In the 14th century, the Javanese manuscript Nagarakretagama, written by Prapanca in 1365, mentioned Barune as a constituent state of Hindu Majapahit, which was to make an annual tribute of 40 katis of camphor. In 1369, Sulu, which was also formerly part of Majapahit, had successfully rebelled and then attacked Boni, and had invaded the northeast coast of Borneo, afterward looting Boni's capital of its treasure and gold including taking two sacred pearls. A fleet from Majapahit succeeded in driving away the Sulus, but Boni was left weaker after the attack. A Chinese report from 1371 described Boni as poor and totally controlled by Majapahit.

== Islamisation and establishment of the sultanate ==
By the 15th century, the empire had become a Muslim state, the King of Brunei having declared independence from Majapahit and converting to Islam, which was brought by Muslim Indians and Arab merchants from other parts of Maritime Southeast Asia, who came to trade and spread Islam. During the rule of Bolkiah, the fifth Sultan, the empire controlled the coastal areas of northwest Borneo (present-day Brunei, Sarawak, and Sabah) and reached the Philippines at Sulu. In the 16th century, the empire's influence also extended as far as the Kapuas River delta in West Kalimantan.

Other sultanates in the area had close relations with the royal house of Brunei, in some cases effectively coming under the hegemony of the Brunei ruling family for periods of time. These rulers included the Malay sultans of Pontianak, Samarinda, and Banjarmasin. The Malay Sultanate of Sambas, in present-day West Kalimantan, the Sultanate of Sulu, and the Kingdom of Luzon had formed dynastic relations with the royal house of Brunei. The Sultanate of Sarawak (covering present-day Kuching, known to Portuguese cartographers as Cerava, and one of the five great seaports on the island of Borneo), though under the influence of Brunei, was self-governed under Sultan Tengah before being fully integrated into the Bruneian Empire upon Tengah's death in 1641.

=== Relations with Europeans ===
Brunei's relations varied with the different European powers in the region.

==== Portuguese ====
The Portuguese, for the most part, were more interested in economic and trading relations with the regional powers and did little to interfere with Brunei's development. This does not mean that relations were always cordial, such as in 1536 when the Portuguese attacked the Muslims in the Moluccas, and the ambassador to the Brunei court had to leave because of the sultan's hostility. The Portuguese also noted that the sultanate was heavily involved in the region's politics and wars, and that Brunei merchants could be found in Ligor and Siam.

==== Conflict with the Spanish Empire ====
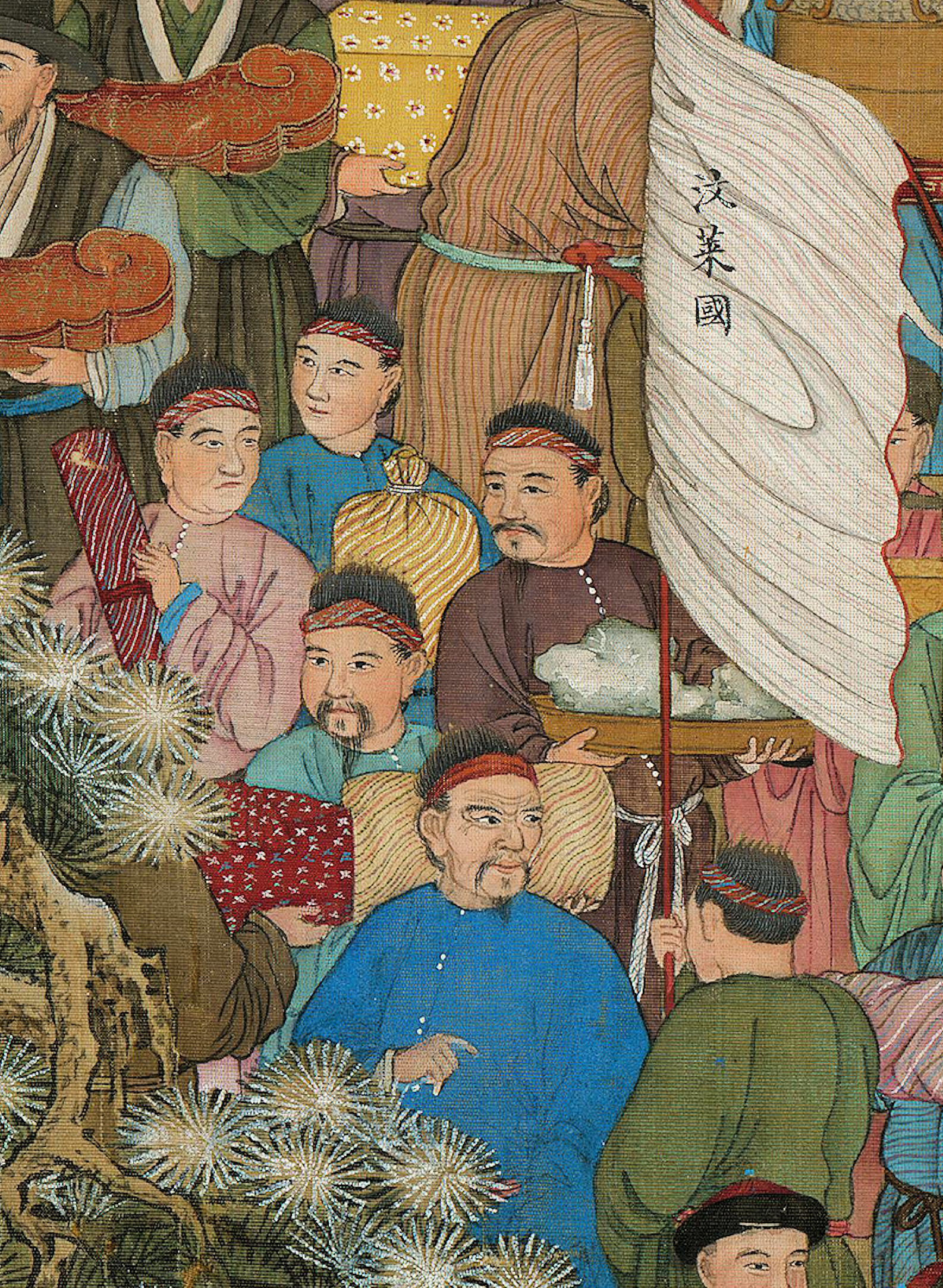
Brunei (汶莱國) delegates in Beijing, China, in 1761

Relations with Spain were far more hostile. From 1565 on, Spanish and Brunei forces engaged in a number of naval skirmishes, and in 1571, the Spanish, who had been sending expeditions from Mexico, succeeded in capturing Manila from the Brunei aristocracy that had been established there. Brunei raised several large fleets intending to recapture the city, but the campaigns, for various reasons, were never launched. (Note: The Chinese pirate Limahon attacked Manila in December 1574, but Brunei was unable to take advantage of the Spaniards' distraction.) In 1578, the Spanish demanded that the sultan cease Islamic proselytising in the Philippines and, in turn, allow Christian missionaries into Brunei. In the resulting Castilian War, the Spanish took Sulu and in April captured Brunei itself. The Sultan of Brunei and the royal family had already retreated to Jerudong by arranging a strategy with brave warriors to drive out the Spanish and with the fighting spirit of the Brunei warriors, they had succeeded in defeating the Spanish after only 72 days of Domination and Spanish returned to Manila on 26 June 1578. The short-term damage to the sultanate was minimal, as Sulu regained its independence soon after. However, Brunei failed to regain a foothold on Luzon, with the island firmly in Spanish hands. In their war against Spain, the Bruneians were supported by Lascars and the Ottoman Empire. The Spanish were aware of this and complained to their king, relating how Turks and even Granadans (from the Emirate of Granada) assisted Borneans in their war against Spain. Muslim migration from the Ottoman Empire, Egypt, and Arabia was so constant that Melchor Davalos complained to the Spanish King of their presence in Borneo and the Philippines.

Persians and Arabs and Egyptians and Turks brought [Muhammad's] veneration and evil sect here, and even Moors from Tunis and Granada came here, sometimes in the armadas of Campson [Kait Bey], former Sultan of Cairo and King of Egypt... Thus it seems to me that these Moros of the Philippine Islands [are] mainly those who, as had been said, come from Egypt and Arabia and Mecca, and are their relatives, disciples, and members, and every year they say that Turks come to Sumatra and Borneo, and to Ternate, where there are now some of those defeated in the famous battle which Señor Don Juan de Austria won.

— Melchor Davalos

To counteract Ottoman assistance to the Bruneians, Spain levied soldiers from their vassal states in Peru and Mexico, to supplement the Spanish troops sent to the Philippines. However, the Bruneian-Spanish conflict eventually died down.

The long-term effects of regional changes could not be avoided. After Sultan Hassan, Brunei entered a period of decline, due to internal battles over royal succession as well as the rising influences of European colonial powers in the region, that, among other things, disrupted traditional trading patterns, destroying the economic base of Brunei and many other Southeast Asian sultanates.

==== Relationship with the British and Sarawak ====
During Sultan Omar Ali Saifuddin II's reign, disturbances occurred in Sarawak. In 1839, the British adventurer James Brooke arrived in Borneo and helped the Sultan put down this rebellion. As a reward, Brooke became governor and later "White Rajah" of Sarawak and gradually expanded the territory under his control. Brooke never gained control of Brunei, though he did attempt to. He asked the British to check whether or not it would be acceptable for him to claim Brunei as his own; however, they said although Brunei was poorly governed, it had a definite sense of national identity and therefore could not be absorbed by Brooke.

In 1843, an open conflict between Brooke and the Sultan ended in the latter's defeat. The Sultan recognised Sarawak's independence. In 1846, Brunei Town was attacked and captured by the British, and Sultan Saifuddin II was forced to sign a treaty to end the British occupation of Brunei Town. In the same year, Sultan Omar Ali Saifuddin II ceded Labuan to the British under the Treaty of Labuan.

In 1847, the Sultan signed the Treaty of Friendship and Commerce with the British, officially ceding Labuan and establishing a British foothold in the north of Borneo to counterbalance the Dutch presence. In 1850, he signed a similar treaty with the United States, which, after a series of events, resulted in the first consul of the US, Charles Lee Moses, burning down his consulate. Over the years, the Sultans of Brunei ceded further stretches of territory to Sarawak; in 1877, stretches to the east of the capital were leased (later ceded) to the British North Borneo Chartered Company (North Borneo). Eventually, due to these seizures of territory, the British occupied the vast majority of the coast of Brunei. The Sultan only stopped handing over territory when Sarawak asked for Limbang, which the Sultan refused. Against the Sultan's wishes, Sarawak obtained control over the territory.

== British protectorate of Brunei ==
The term Brunei Protectorate or British Protectorate of Brunei was used to describe a British protected state that encompassed what is modern-day Brunei. The 1905–1906 Supplementary Treaty established a British Resident whose counsel was obligatory on the Sultan in all domains, save Islamic ones. The Resident became the most powerful person in the Sultanate as a result of this system, which essentially gave him substantial administrative authority equivalent to that of a Chief justice and Menteri Besar combined. The Resident appointed four district officers who answered directly to him, supervising all aspects of administration. He also had the power to appoint traditional authorities such as penghulu and ketua kampong.

=== Treaty of Protection and decline ===
Significant changes in Brunei's history occurred as a result of Britain's efforts to increase its influence in the area in the late 19th century in reaction to geopolitical worries about the German Empire and the United States. A significant turning point for Brunei was reached when Sultan Hashim Jalilul Alam Aqamaddin and the British government, represented by Hugh Low, signed the Protectorate Agreement on 17 September 1888, with the intention of obtaining security assurances from Lord Salisbury. Due to this treaty, Brunei's foreign affairs were essentially handed over to Britain, preventing the Sultan from holding direct talks with North Borneo and Sarawak, two nearby states.

However, only two years later, in March 1890, Charles Brooke's annexation of Limbang exposed the treaty's shortcomings and significantly weakened Brunei's sovereignty. Although Brunei was meant to be protected, the Treaty of Protection allowed the British to prioritise their geopolitical interests, resulting in more territorial expansions and internal challenges for Brunei. Sultan Hashim's disappointment with British support peaked in 1902 when he sent a heartfelt letter to King Edward VII, lamenting the lack of assistance his country had received since signing the treaty and the mounting difficulties it faced.

In early 1901, the resurgence of violence in Tutong forced the British Foreign Office to reassess its stance on Brunei. Sultan Hashim's leadership was criticised by many British officials, and sentiment in the region began to shift toward Sarawak's government, which was perceived as offering more equitable taxes and better administration of Brunei's shrinking territory. Concerns raised by Chinese traders about governance further portrayed Brunei as economically fragile and unstable. Despite these challenges, Sultan Hashim remained committed to preserving Brunei's independence, even as financial strains worsened.

In 1901, Sultan Hashim's financial situation deteriorated, leading him to borrow $10,000 from Brooke for household expenses. Amidst these difficulties, he arranged a lavish royal wedding for his grandson to strengthen political ties. However, concerned for the future of his dynasty, the Sultan firmly rejected Brooke and Hewett's proposal to cede the Belait and Tutong districts. As his dissatisfaction with British administration grew, Sultan Hashim expressed his willingness in 1903 to transfer Brunei to the Ottoman Empire due to what he saw as the oppression of Islam and the loss of territory. Efforts to transfer Brunei to Sarawak ultimately failed after a smallpox epidemic in 1904 claimed the lives of the newlywed couple.

=== McArthur's report and impact ===
The Report On Brunei produced by Malcolm McArthur after his 1904 expedition to Brunei was crucial in changing British perspectives toward the sultanate. Unlike previous assessments, McArthur's report offered a more balanced view, recognising Sultan Hashim's dignity and the challenges he faced. It highlighted the Sultan's feelings of abandonment and despair, providing a deeper understanding of his situation. McArthur's findings played a key role in shaping future interactions and governance in Brunei.

Sultan Hashim agreed to McArthur's proposal to establish a British Residency system in Brunei. The Sultan and his Wazirs signed the 1905–1906 Supplementary Treaty, which was formalised in early 1906 during Sir John Anderson's visit. Anderson praised McArthur for his reliable leadership, emphasizing its importance for Brunei's future. Sultan Hashim expressed his relief, thanking Anderson for his assurances regarding Brunei's Islamic status, reflecting the Sultan's efforts to protect Brunei through diplomatic agreements.

The Wazirs saw a decrease in their importance during British administration, primarily due to land reforms that impacted their means of survival and customary authority. After 1906, Sultan Hashim's standing as the head of state became more symbolic, while actual authority shifted significantly. The establishment of the British Residency marked a new era, where the British Resident took on the role of governance. Sultan Hashim faced ongoing challenges that resulted in the loss of important regions and severe poverty, affecting both the palace and the general public.

=== Symbolic authority and Japanese occupation ===
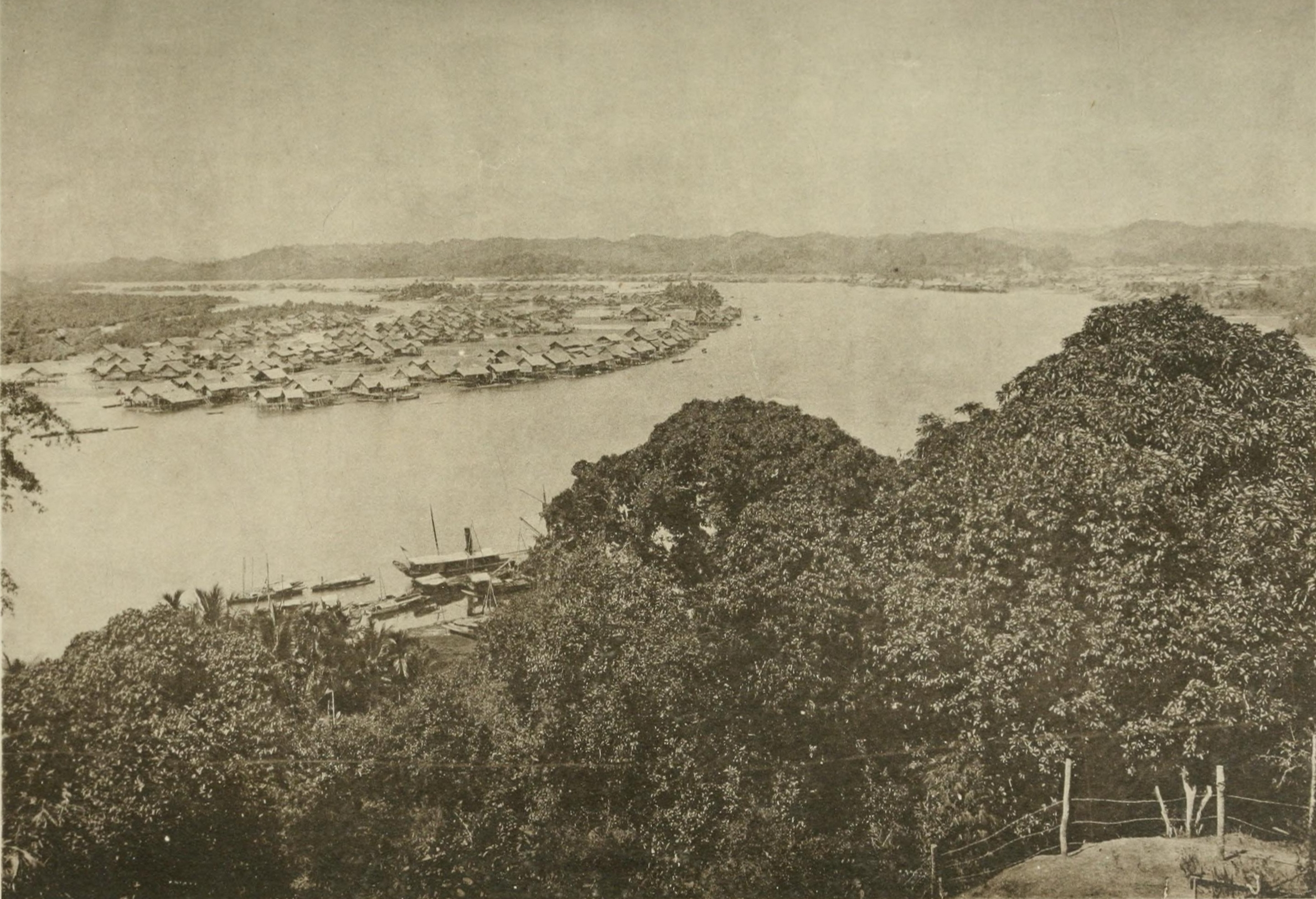
Kampong Ayer sitting on the Brunei River in 1912

Except in questions of religion and custom, Sultan Muhammad Jamalul Alam II's executive powers were passed to the British Resident with the implementation of the British Residency system. Under his rule, he promoted the immigration of Chinese for their economic talents and oversaw the adoption of syariah law in Brunei, with the 1913 Marriage and Divorce Act and the 1912 Mohammedan Laws Enactment, which superseded the Kanun Brunei.

During his reign, Brunei participated in the Malay and Borneo Cultural Festival in 1922, when he became the first Sultan to visit Singapore, escorted by traditional musicians. Additionally, in 1909, he became the first Sultan to have his palace moved from Kampong Ayer to solid land. The first crude oil find in Brunei was discovered in the same year, although significant oil strikes did not occur until 1927. The Sultan also welcomed the Prince of Wales on 18 May 1922, showcasing the Sultanate's regal traditions.

After his father's death, Sultan Ahmad Tajuddin assumed the throne and was marked by a more cautious attitude than his predecessor. He often relied on international consultants, such as Gerard MacBryan, over local leaders, which was indicative of his ongoing reliance on outside influence. To show his dissatisfaction with Brunei's structure, between 1931 and 1950 he often skipped State Council sessions. He selected a competent personal assistant to help him navigate governance. Even though he became the first Sultan to attain complete sovereignty in 1931 at the age of 18, he later went to England to improve his language skills.

Despite worries over the distribution of income from oil exports, Sultan Ahmad Tajuddin worked to strengthen financial rules for Brunei's residents. He was well known for his hospitality to visitors, particularly high-ranking officials. He attempted to build links throughout his rule, including a notable effort to wed the daughter of the Sultan of Selangor, which strengthened the bonds between the two royal houses. However, by the late 1930s, his relationship with the British worsened, reflecting greater issues in Brunei's political environment and governance under colonial rule. To foster local governance, Sultan Ahmad Tajuddin pushed for the recruitment of 25 Bruneians to higher posts in the Brunei Administrative Service (BAS). This resulted in their appointment to the government bureaucracy in 1941. In an effort to further Islamic education, he founded a private Arabic school in 1940. It was forced to close in 1942 due to Japanese occupation. The Sultan backed the creation of regional defence units, such as the Brunei Volunteer Force, to help the British repel a Japanese invasion as tensions with Japan increased. But as the occupation progressed, his position became mostly symbolic, with the Japanese provincial governor holding actual authority. In spite of this, he was able to retake several areas that Brunei had previously lost, indicating a long-standing intention to take back control of these regions.

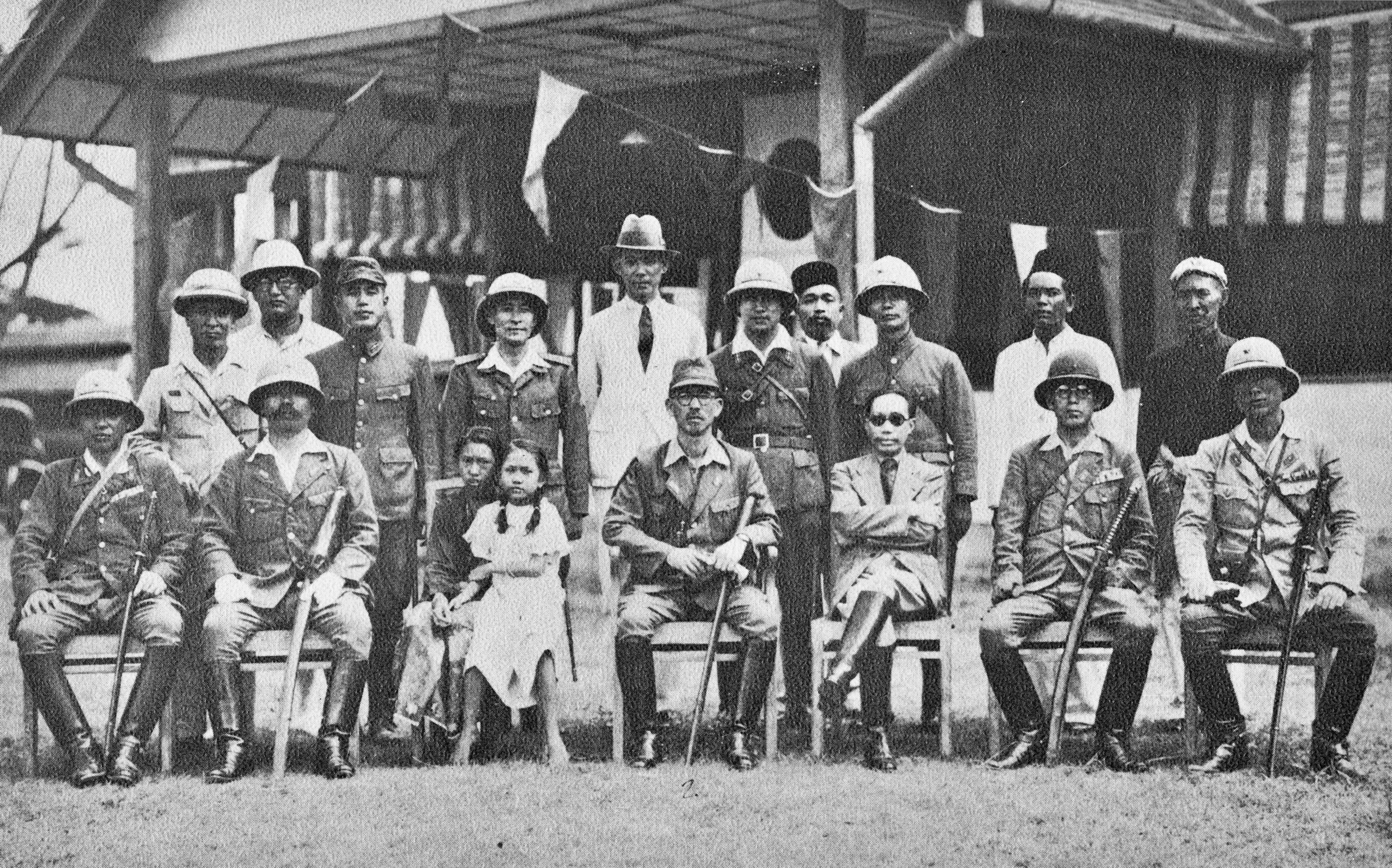
The Sultan and Maeda Yoshinori's forces in 1942–1945

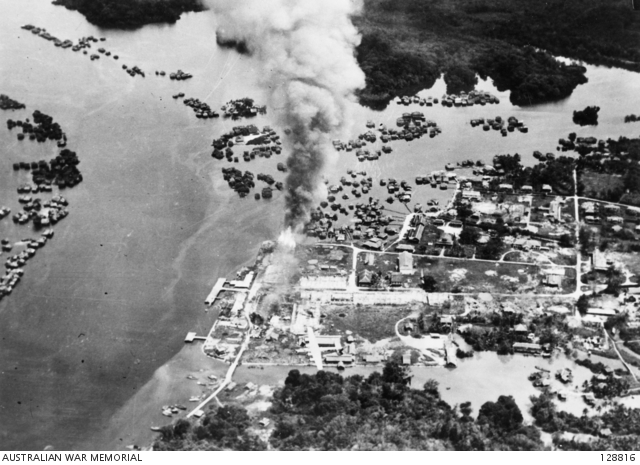
Allied bombings of Japanese-occupied Brunei Town in 1945

The Sultan had little real influence during the occupation, but his status was preserved so the Japanese could win over the locals. He was given decorations and a salary upon the country's surrender to the Japanese Army during World War II in December 1941, although his main role was that of ceremonial commander. Locals began to oppose the Japanese administration more and more, especially as food shortages became severe. Local authorities concealed the Sultan to shield him and his family from the increasing violence. He was greeted as a hero upon his return when Australian forces liberated Brunei in June 1945, but Brunei stayed under military rule until civilian governance was reinstated in July 1946. As the British attempted to establish greater control over the area in the post-war era, the Sultan struggled to reclaim total authority, which resulted in persistent conflicts with the British Military Administration over administrative oversight and governance.

=== Struggle for Independence ===
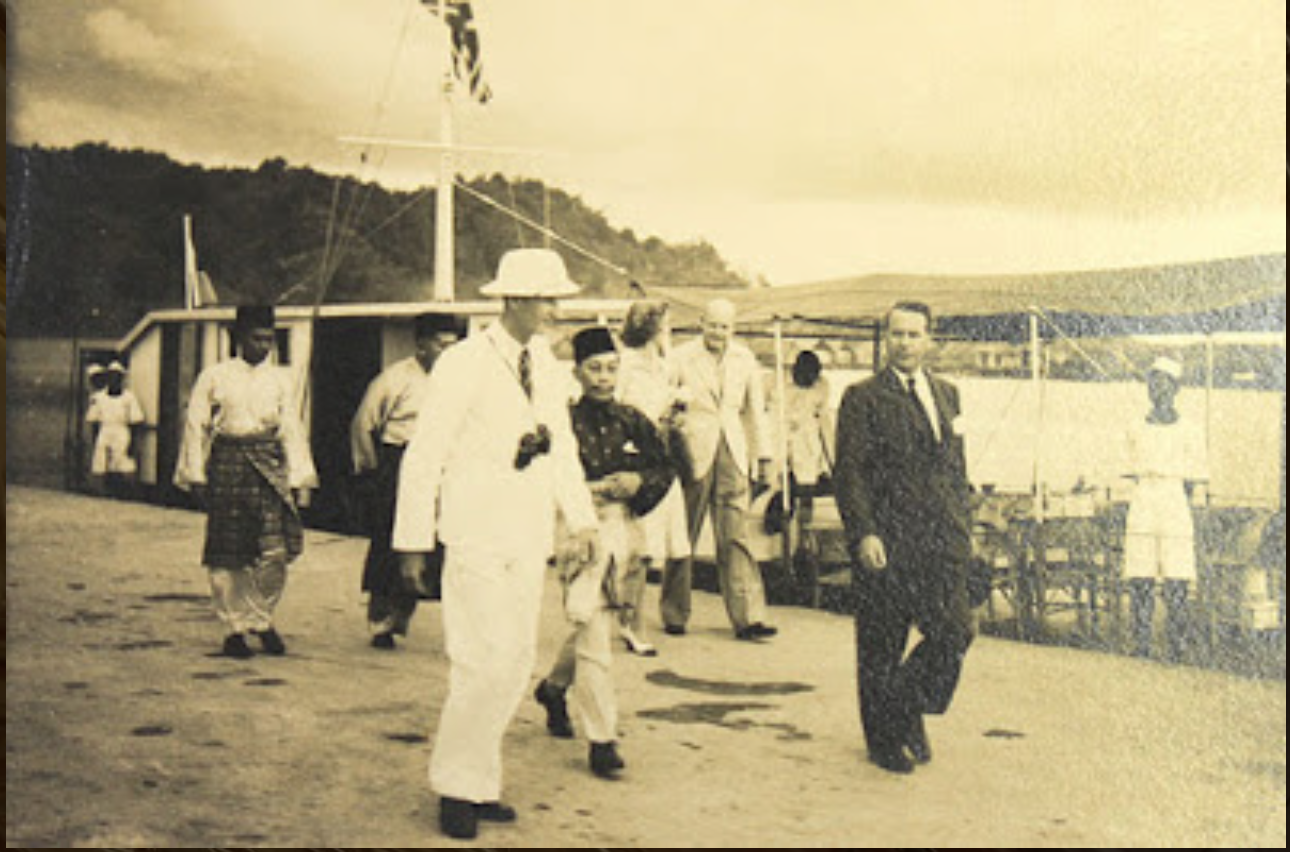
The Sultan welcoming MacDonald upon the latter's arrival in Brunei

Sultan Ahmad Tajuddin was portrayed by British envoy Malcolm MacDonald in July 1946 as a weak and indulgent king who was driven by excess and a lack of dedication to his royal duties. In Brunei Town, a welcome arch was built during MacDonald's visit, bearing the words "Restorer of Peace and Justice" beneath the Union Jack, emphasising the rights of the Sultan and his subjects. The Sultan was echoing local sentiments, and he ignored British instructions to change the words on the arch, a reflection of his complex relationship with colonial authority.

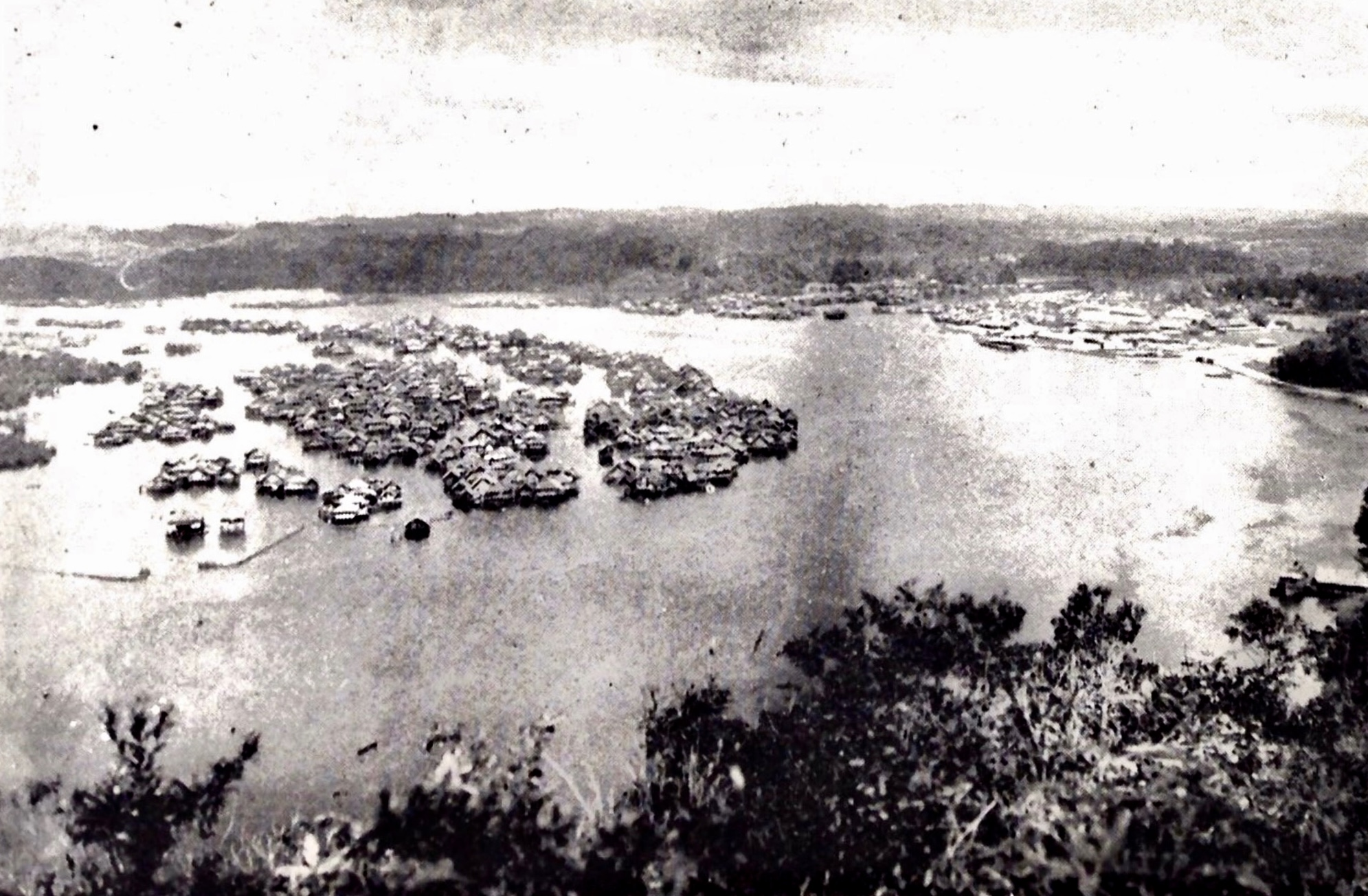
Brunei Town and Kampong Ayer separated by the Brunei River in 1947

Because MacDonald's proposal to maintain Brunei's independence from Sarawak and North Borneo was supported by the Secretary of State for the Colonies, the Sultan was able to consolidate his control following World War II. The Sultan said that Brunei ought to have profited from any changes in territory, and he was unhappy with the British Crown's handling of Sarawak. As a demonstration of his support for local political movements, Brunei developed its national song, "Allah Peliharakan Sultan", and adopted the Barisan Pemuda's (BARIP) flag. In an effort to improve relations, Resident Eric Pretty was reappointed in August 1948 as tensions between the Sultan and British authorities increased. Pretty recommended that the Sultan write to the Secretary of State, highlighting Brunei's challenges and proposing the building of a new palace in place of the one that had been destroyed during the war.

In 1950, Sultan Ahmad Tajuddin became increasingly political, frustrated by the British government's refusal to rebuild his palace despite higher oil revenues. He sought to renegotiate Brunei's constitutional relationship with the Britain and pushed for increased oil royalties from British Malayan Petroleum. Planning a trip to London with his advisor MacBryan, the Sultan also expressed dissatisfaction with Brunei's oilfield concessions and Sarawak's cession. As Political Secretary, MacBryan advocated for including Muslims from northern Borneo and the southern Philippines in Brunei's post-war administration, a move that raised concerns at the British Colonial Office regarding the potential impact on Brunei's oil output and sovereignty. The Sultan's initiatives aimed to address economic challenges and enhance Brunei's standing in negotiations with Britain.

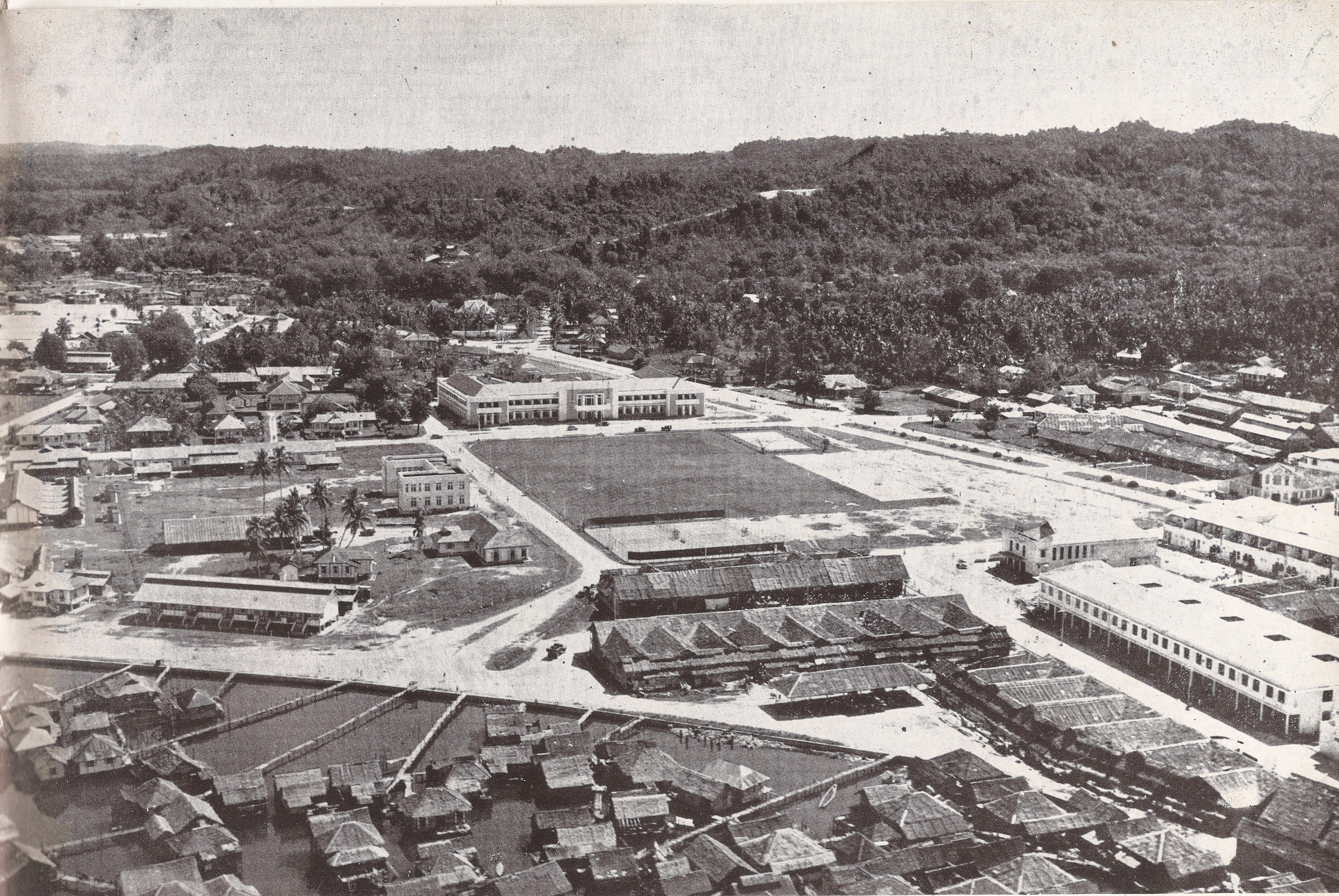
Brunei Town in 1950

After ascending to the throne, Sultan Omar Ali Saifuddien III became the leader of the Islamic faith in Brunei, with the primary goal of improving the educational system. In 1950, Brunei began sending students to the Al-Juned Arabic School in Singapore, and by 1963 the first Bruneian graduated from Al-Azhar University in Egypt, marking a significant advancement in regional Islamic education. The Sultan's administration allocated B$10.65 million to education in 1954, which funded the construction of 30 schools and provided free meals for students. To accommodate the growing student population, notable secondary schools, such as Sultan Muhammad Jamalul Alam Secondary School and Sultan Omar Ali Saifuddien College, were built. Additionally, the Department of Religious Affairs was established in 1954 to oversee Brunei's Islamic constitutional matters, leading to the opening of seven religious schools by 1956 and greatly enhancing Islamic education in the country.

Brunei's oil sector grew rapidly beginning in 1950, with the country's first oil platform built in Seria in 1952. A$14 million gas pipeline was installed in 1955, and by 1956 the Seria field was producing 114,700 barrels of oil per day. Since its founding in 1957, the Brunei Shell Petroleum firm has produced a substantial amount of crude oil and natural gasoline, totaling 705,000 tons and 39.5 million tons, respectively. The 1st National Development Plan, initiated in 1953, prioritised public health and infrastructure, with a B$100 million budget allocated for building Muara Port and developing transportation, telecommunication, energy, and water supply. This initiative also significantly reduced the number of malaria cases while improving public health through the provision of clean water and enhanced sanitation. By 1958, B$4 million had been spent on education, and Brunei Airport was renovated in 1954, which greatly increased communication and transit.

In early 1959, Sultan Omar Ali Saifuddien III led a delegation to London to finalise Brunei's Constitution after the Merdeka Talks. Between 23 March and 6 April 1959, negotiations with British officials addressed key constitutional issues, including council meetings, elections, and the role of the Menteri Besar. An agreement was reached on 6 April 1959, leading to the phased implementation of the Constitution. On 29 September 1959, the Sultan signed and proclaimed Brunei's first written Constitution, which ended British control, on the basis of the 1888 and 1905–06 treaties, and restored Brunei's sovereignty over its internal affairs.

=== Post-independence and beyond ===
Brunei gained its independence from the United Kingdom on 1 January 1984, joining ASEAN in the same year. Economic growth from its extensive petroleum and natural gas fields during the 1990s and 2000s, with its GDP increasing 56% from 1999 to 2008, transformed Brunei into an industrialised country. Brunei has the second-highest Human Development Index among the Southeast Asian nations, after Singapore, and is classified as a "developed country". In 2014, the Sultan instituted an Islamic Sharia penal code.

== See also ==
- Bruneian Civil War of 1660
- Bruneian Civil War of 1826
- List of sultans of Brunei
- History of Southeast Asia
- History of Asia

== Sources ==
- The Philippine Islands: Explorations by Early Navigators, Descriptions of the Islands and their People, their History and Records of the Catholics Missions, as related in contemporaneous Books and Manuscripts. Vol. IV: 1576–1582. Eds. Emma Helen Blair and James Alexander Robertson. Cleveland: The Arthur H. Clark Company, 1903.
- de Vienne, Marie-Sybille (2015), Brunei: From the Age of Commerce to the 21st Century, Singapore: NUS Press, ISBN 9789971698188
- Abdul Majid, Harun (2007). Rebellion in Brunei: The 1962 Revolt, Imperialism, Confrontation and Oil. I.B.Tauris. ISBN 978-1-84511-423-7.
- Atiyah, Jeremy (2002), Rough guide to Southeast Asia, Rough Guide, ISBN 978-1-85828-893-2
- Awang Juned, Awang Abdul Aziz bin (1992). Islam di Brunei: zaman pemerintahan Kebawah Duli Yang Maha Mulia Paduka Seri Baginda Sultan Haji Hassanal Bolkiah Mu'izzuddin Waddaulah, Sultan dan Yang Di-Pertuan Negara Brunei Darussalam (in Malay). Department of History of Brunei Darussalam.
- "Background Note: Brunei Darussalam". US State Department. Archived from the original on 4 June 2019.
- Church, Peter (2012). A Short History of South-East Asia. John Wiley & Sons. ISBN 978-1-118-35044-7.
- Eur (2002). The Far East and Australasia 2003. Psychology Press. ISBN 978-1-85743-133-9.
- Frankham, Steve (2008), Footprint Borneo, Footprint Guides, ISBN 978-1-906098-14-8
- Herbert, Patricia; Milner, Anthony Crothers (1989). South-East Asia: Languages and Literatures: a Select Guide. University of Hawaii Press. ISBN 978-0-8248-1267-6.
- Hicks, Nigel (2007). The Philippines. New Holland Publishers. ISBN 978-1-84537-663-5.
- History for Brunei Darussalam: Sharing our Past. Curriculum Development Department, Ministry of Education of Brunei Darussalam. 2009. ISBN 978-99917-2-372-3.
- Kurz, Johannes (2013), "Pre-modern Chinese Sources in the National History of Brunei: The Case of Poli", Bijdragen tot de Taal-, Land- en Volkenkunde, 169 (2–3): 213–243, doi:10.1163/22134379-12340030
- Kurz, Johannes (2014), "Boni in Chinese Sources from the Tenth to the Eighteenth Centuries", International Journal of Asia Pacific Studies, 10 (1): 1–32
- Kurz, Johannes (2016), "A Note on the Tombstone of Master Pu in Brunei and the Xishan zazhi", Bijdragen tot de Taal-, Land- en Volkenkunde, 172 (4): 510–537, doi:10.1163/22134379-17204001
- Kurz, Johannes (2018), "Making History in Borneo: Ong Sum Ping and His Others during the Late Yuan and Early Ming Dynasties", International Journal of Asia Pacific Studies, 14 (2): 79–104, doi:10.21315/IJAPS2018.14.2.4
- Kurz, Johannes (2020), "The Creation of a Shared Past: Two Thousand Years of China-Brunei "Historical Relations"", Journal of Asian History, 54: 157–183, doi:10.13173/jasiahist.54.1.0157
- Lea, David; Milward, Colette (2001). A Political Chronology of South-East Asia and Oceania. Psychology Press. ISBN 978-1-85743-117-9.
- Nicholl, Robert (March 1983), "Brunei Rediscovered: A Survey of Early Times", Journal of Southeast Asian Studies, 14 (1), Cambridge University Press: 32–45, doi:10.1017/S0022463400008973, JSTOR 20174317, S2CID 161541098
- Ongkili, James P. "Ancient Chinese Trading Links." East Malaysia and Brunei. Ed. Wendy Hutton. Tuttle Publishing, 2001.
- Saunders, Graham E. (2002), A history of Brunei, Routledge, ISBN 978-0-7007-1698-2
- Saunders, Graham (2013). A History of Brunei. Taylor & Francis. ISBN 978-1-136-87401-7.
- Sidhu, Jatswan S. (2009). Historical Dictionary of Brunei Darussalam. Scarecrow Press. ISBN 978-0-8108-7078-9.
- Suyatno (2008). "Naskah Nagarakretagama" (in Indonesian). National Library of Indonesia. Archived from the original on 23 May 2017.
- Welman, Frans (2013). Borneo Trilogy Brunei: Vol 1. Booksmango. ISBN 978-616-222-235-1.
- Wright, Leigh. "Brunei: An Historical Relic." Journal of the Hong Kong Branch of the Royal Asiatic Society. Vol. 17 (1977).
- Hussainmiya, B. A. (2019). The Making of Brunei's 1959 Constitution. Constitutional Foundings in Southeast Asia: An important collection of essays exploring the founding of constitutions in Southeast Asian states, featuring contributions by leading scholars. Oxford University Press. Archived from the original on 7 October 2024.
- Hussainmiya, B. A. (1 January 2012). "Royal Brunei Armed Forces 50th anniversary commemorative history". RBAF 50th Golden Anniversary Commemorative Book. South Eastern University of Sri Lanka.
- Hussainmiya, B. A. (2006). Brunei: Revival of 1906: A Popular History. Brunei Press. ISBN 978-99917-32-15-2.
- Hussainmiya, B. A. (26 December 2003). "Resuscitating nationalism: Brunei under the Japanese Military Administration (1941-1945)". Senri Ethnological Studies. 65. doi:10.15021/00002724.
- Hussainmiya, B. A. (September 2000). ""Manufacturing Consensus": The Role of the State Council in Brunei Darussalam". Journal of Southeast Asian Studies. 31 (2). Cambridge University Press: 321–350. doi:10.1017/S0022463400017586.
- Hussainmiya, B. A. (1995). Sultan Omar Ali Saifuddin III and Britain, The Making of Brunei Darssalam. Kuala Lumpur: Oxford University Press.
- Mohd Jamil Al-Sufri (Pehin Orang Kaya Amar Diraja Dato Seri Utama Haji Awang.) (2000). History of Brunei in Brief. Brunei History Centre, Ministry of Culture, Youth and Sports. ISBN 978-99917-34-11-8.
- Mohd Jamil Al-Sufri (Pehin Orang Kaya Amar Diraja Dato Seri Utama Haji Awang.) (2008). Melayu Islam Beraja: hakikat dan hasrat (in Malay). Jabatan Pusat Sejarah, Kementerian Kebudayaan, Belia dan Sukan, Negara Brunei Darussalam. ISBN 978-99917-34-63-7.
- Thumboo, Edwin (1996). Cultures in ASEAN and the 21st Century. Unipress Corporation. ISBN 978-981-00-8174-4.
- Ooi, Keat Gin; King, Victor T. (29 July 2022). Routledge Handbook of Contemporary Brunei. Taylor & Francis. ISBN 978-1-000-56864-6.
- Horton, A. V. M. (1986). "British Administration in Brunei 1906-1959". Modern Asian Studies. 20 (2): 353–374. doi:10.1017/S0026749X00000871. ISSN 0026-749X. JSTOR 312580. S2CID 144185859.
- Zullkiflee, Nurul Amalina (2019). Strategi Awang Haji Kassim dalam Usaha Menyelamatkan Sultan Ahmad Tajuddin: Satu Kajian Awal (PDF). Universiti Islam Sultan Sharif Ali.
- Saunders, Graham (2003). A History of Brunei (2nd ed.). Abingdon: RoutledgeCurzon. ISBN 9781138863453.
- Saunders, Graham (1994). A History of Brunei (1st ed.). Kuala Lumpur: Oxford University Press. ISBN 9789676530493.
- Reece, Bob (2009). ""The Little Sultan": Ahmad Tajuddin II of Brunei, Gerard MacBryan, and. Malcolm Macdonald" (PDF). Borneo Research Bulletin. 40. Borneo Research Council. ISSN 0006-7806.
- Muhammad Melayong, Dr Muhammad Hadi (2009). Memoir seorang negarawan (in Malay). Bandar Seri Begawan: Brunei History Centre. ISBN 978-99917-34-69-9.
- Ahad, Nazirul Mubin (2015). "EFFORTS OF SULTAN HAJI OMAR ALI SAIFUDDIEN III IN PRESERVING ISLAMIC DOCTRINE OF AHLUS SUNNAH WAL JAMĀ'AH". Konferensi Antarabangsa Islam Borneo VIII. UNISSA.
- Shimizu, Akitoshi; Bremen, Jan van; Hakubutsukan, Kokuritsu Minzokugaku (2003). Wartime Japanese Anthropology in Asia and the Pacific. National Museum of Ethnology. ISBN 978-4-901906-21-0.
- Prasetyo (13 July 2011). Pergerakan Pemuda Di Brunei Darussalam (1946–1962) [Youth Movement in Brunei Darussalam (1946–1962)] (in Indonesian). Indonesia: Universitas Indonesia.
- Welsh, Bridget; Somiah, Vilashini; Loh, Benjamin Y. H. (3 May 2021). Sabah from the Ground: The 2020 Elections and the Politics of Survival. Strategic Information & Research Devt Centre/ISEAS-Yusof Ishak Institute. ISBN 978-981-4951-69-2.
- Siti Nor Anis Nadiah Haji Mohamad; Mariam Abdul Rahman (15 November 2021). "Penggubalan Perlembagaan Negeri Brunei 1959: Satu Sorotan Sejarah" [Drafting of The Brunei Constitutions of 1959: A Historical Review]. The Sultan Alauddin Sulaiman Shah Journal. 8 (2).
- Dayangku Herney Zuraidh binti Pengiran Haji Rosley (2007). "Pemerintahan Sultan Omar 'Ali Saifuddien III (1950–1967)" (PDF). history-centre.gov.bn (in Malay). Archived from the original (PDF) on 18 May 2024.
- DDW Hj Tamit, Datin Dr. Hajah Saadiah (March 2006). "PENTADBIRAN UNDANG-UNDANG ISLAM DI NEGARA BRUNEI DARUSSALAM PADA ZAMAN BRITISH" (PDF). Akedemi Pengajian Brunei, Universiti Brunei Darussalam (in Malay).
- McArthur, Malcolm Stewart Hannibal (1987). Report on Brunei in 1904. Ohio University Center for International Studies, Center for Southeast Asian Studies. ISBN 978-0-89680-135-6.
- Great Britain Colonial Office (1965). Brunei. H.M. Stationery Office.
- Great Britain Colonial Office (1949). The Colonial Office List. H.M. Stationery Office. p. 100.
- Great Britain Colonial Office (1948). The Colonial Office List, Comprising Historical and Statistical Information Respecting the Colonial Empire, List of Officers Serving in the Colonies, Etc. H.M. Stationery Office.
- May, Gary (1 November 1998). Hard Oiler!: The Story of Canadians' Quest for Oil at Home and Abroad. Dundurn. ISBN 978-1-4597-1312-3.
- Mohamed, Muhaimin (2002). Sultan Ahmad Tajuddin 1924–1940: Hubungan Raja dengan Penasihat (in Malay). Bandar Seri Begawan: Brunei History Centre. ISBN 99917-34-79-1.
- Ahmad (Haji.), Zaini Haji (2003). Brunei merdeka: sejarah dan budaya politik (in Malay). De'Imas Printing. ISBN 978-99917-34-01-9.
- Awang Mohamad Yusop Damit (1995). Brunei Darussalam 1944-1962: Constitutional and Political Development in a Malay-Muslim Sultanate. University of London.
- Jabatan Muzium-Muzium Brunei (2004). Sungai Limau Manis: Tapak Arkeologi Abad Ke-10 – 13 Masihi (in Malay). Jabatan Muzium-Muzium Brunei. ISBN 9991730184. OCLC 61123390.
- Wright, Leigh R. (1 July 1988). The Origins of British Borneo. Hong Kong University Press. ISBN 978-962-209-213-6.
