= Malcolm Stewart Hannibal McArthur =

First British resident of Brunei (1872–1934)

Malcolm McArthur
- McArthur in c. 1890

British Advisor of Kedah
- In office July 1919 – 1922
- Monarch: George V
- Preceded by: William George Maxwell
- Succeeded by: Frederick James Hallifax

1st British Resident to Brunei
- In office January 1908 – April 1908
- Monarch: Edward VII
- Preceded by: Harvey Chevallier
- Succeeded by: John Fortescue Owen
- In office January 1906 – May 1907
- Preceded by: Office established
- Succeeded by: Harvey Chevallier

Personal details
- Born: 10 March 1872 Chatham, Kent, England
- Died: 20 February 1934 (aged 61) Villa Belfiore, Lombardy, Kingdom of Italy (present day Italy)
- Education: Kelly College; Tavistock College
- Alma mater: The Queen's College, Oxford
- Occupation: Colonial administrator

Malcolm Stewart Hannibal McArthur (10 March 1872 – 20 February 1934) was the first British resident of Brunei. He played a key role in the talks that resulted in the signing of the 1905 and 1906 Agreement between Great Britain and Brunei as well as the implementation of the Residential system. The accomplishments he is most known for were his establishment of a tax system and a Western-style government in Brunei. He also started making arrangements to persuade the people of Kampong Ayer to relocate to homes on land, setting the groundwork for Brunei Town. Apart from that, he also served as British Advisor of Kedah from 1919 to 1922.

== Early life and education ==
The son of General Charles McArthur and his wife Lucy Large, he was born in Chatham, Kent. He was educated in Kelly College, Tavistock College and The Queen's College, Oxford.

== Strait Settlements ==
McArthur was appointed in 1895 in London after an open competition to Hong Kong and Strait Settlements civil service (later known as Malayan Civil Service). He joined the Strait Settlements in November 1895 and began his career as a cadet. Over the years, his roles changed quickly: in 1895, he was acting deputy registrar of deeds in Penang, where he passed his final Malay language exam in April; by January 1897, he was acting private secretary to the governor of Straits Settlements, Sir Charles Mitchell; in August of the same year, he became acting district officer of Balik Pulau. He was the third magistrate of Penang by 1898. In April 1899, he was appointed acting second assistant colonial secretary.

In keeping with McArthur's rise, he was appointed district officer of Penang in January 1901 after serving as the government of Selangor's interim assistant secretary from April 1900 to January 1901. His flexibility is demonstrated by the fact that in 1902, he also held the positions of acting secretary to the high commissioner of the Federated Malay States in May and acting collector of land tax and registrar of deeds in Singapore. He took up positions in 1903 as assistant superintendent of Indian immigration in August, controller of requests in Singapore as acting commissioner in August, and second assistant colonial secretary in November.

== Brunei ==
=== Early expedition ===
Brunei could use the Residential system, as suggested by North Borneo's Governor Ernest Woodford Birch. Sultan Hashim Jalilul Alam Aqamaddin's diplomatic efforts caused quite a stir since they irritated the British government, which felt that Brunei had been treated with a lack of responsibility. In light of these circumstances, McArthur was dispatched to Brunei in April 1904 as part of a special assignment with the Foreign Office, and to make recommendations about the structure of the administration for the "dying sultanate". He arrived to Brunei on 3 May and remained until 10 November. He was then appointed assistant consul in Brunei in October, having taken up an earlier position of assistant colonial secretary in April.

In order to get knowledge on commerce, the state of the tribal population, and the political landscape, McArthur spent six months in Brunei researching the archives, visiting the nobility, and exploring the neighbouring regions. Sincere in its intent, his report was critical of issues related to economic management as well as judicial and political administration. When he visited the areas of Belait and Tutong in 1904, he discovered that they were wealthier than he had anticipated.

Following his Report On Brunei in 1904 the British government decided to maintain Brunei as a separate administrative entity. Whitehall praised the McArthur Report as "by far the best that has ever been written", described it as "excellent", and commended it as "exhaustive and very useful". He also suggested the residential system for Brunei following a thorough examination of the circumstances. This persuaded Whitehall to establish a British residency, with McArthur as its first inhabitant, rather than giving Brunei to Sarawak.

=== Residential system ===
==== Evolution of Brunei's governance ====
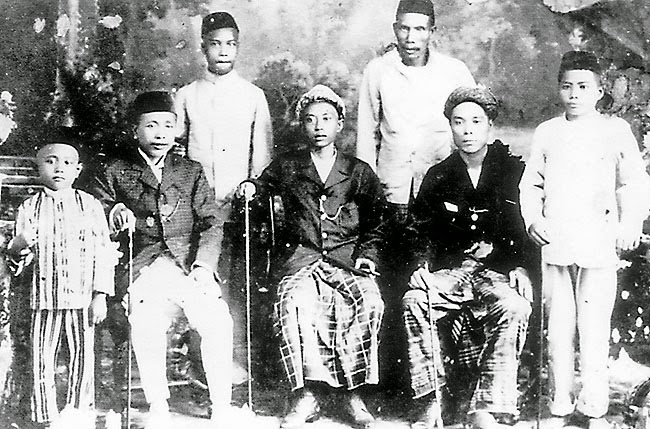
Bruneian Malays in 1915

McArthur was named HBM consul to Crown Colony of Sarawak and British North Borneo by November 1905. In 1906, McArthur was appointed colonial secretary in Crown Colony of Labuan. When the Residential system was implemented in 1906, Brunei was granted complete protection by Great Britain, which thwarted any further attempts by Raj of Sarawak to acquire the territory of the latter. In January 1906, McArthur, the main negotiator in the 1905 discussions with the sultan, was named Brunei's first British Resident and tasked with the rapid creation of a contemporary civil service and restructuring the state's income structure following Western models. By establishing an effective, impersonal civil service for the sake of state administration, the locals were able to start out somewhat. Early on, this resulted in the establishment of departments including public works, postal, customs, and agriculture.

Additional agencies, including the police, medical, and education departments, were added as state funds gradually increased. The state was first split administratively into five districts: Brunei, Muara, Tutong, Belait, and Temburong. Local Malay authorities known as judges were responsible for overseeing these regions. In order to oversee rice growing regions, village headmen and penghulu were designated and given authority and responsibilities akin to that of "peace officers." The 1906 Agreement ensured the monarchy's survival by guaranteeing its hereditary continuation, a matter of concern for Sultan Hashim, who sought reassurance from McArthur that the British had no intention of undermining the throne.

==== Development of Brunei Town ====
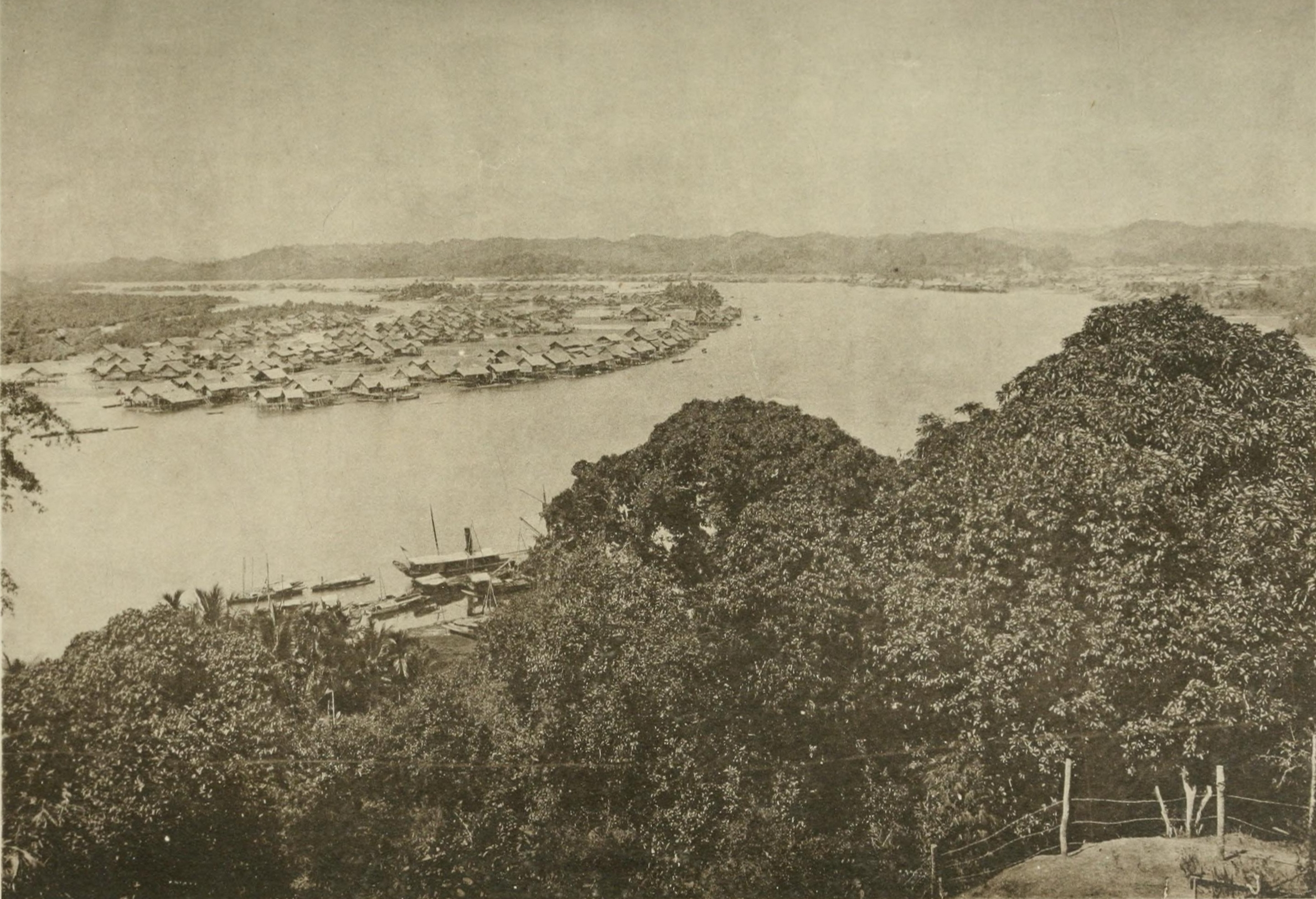
Kampong Ayer in 1912

Over the course of its history, Brunei Town had three major stages of growth. The third phase saw a move toward constructing the city on land, starting in 1906 and led by McArthur. His project attempted to solve issues with sanitation, which were most noticeable in Kampong Ayer, the water village where 8,000–10,000 people lived at the time the Residential system was implemented. Even though Kampong Ayer still had the sultan's palace, McArthur concentrated on establishing a colony on land, beginning with his own resident's office (Bubungan Dua Belas).

Free construction supplies were offered as a draw to entice Kampong Ayer residents to the new land settlement. His goals, however, were not fulfilled as only a small number of Chinese settlers relocated in 1910, despite a severe threat from McArthur that the government would be compelled to impose penalties if the residents did not leave by the end of 1911.

Despite challenges in navigating Malay customs and traditions, McArthur's efforts, led to significant improvements and prevented further annexations of Brunei's lands.

== Later life and death ==
His tenure as residents in both Labuan and Brunei from January of that year would last until 1907. McArthur retired in 1922, due to ill health, moving to Italy. Although he married an Italian, his 1928 will makes no mention of their children. He died at Villa Belfiore, Gradone Riviera in 20 February 1934.

== Works ==
- Malcolm Stewart Hannibal McArthur (1987). Report on Brunei in 1904 (PDF). Ohio University Center for International Studies, Center for Southeast Asian Studies. ISBN 978-0-89680-135-6.

== Legacy ==
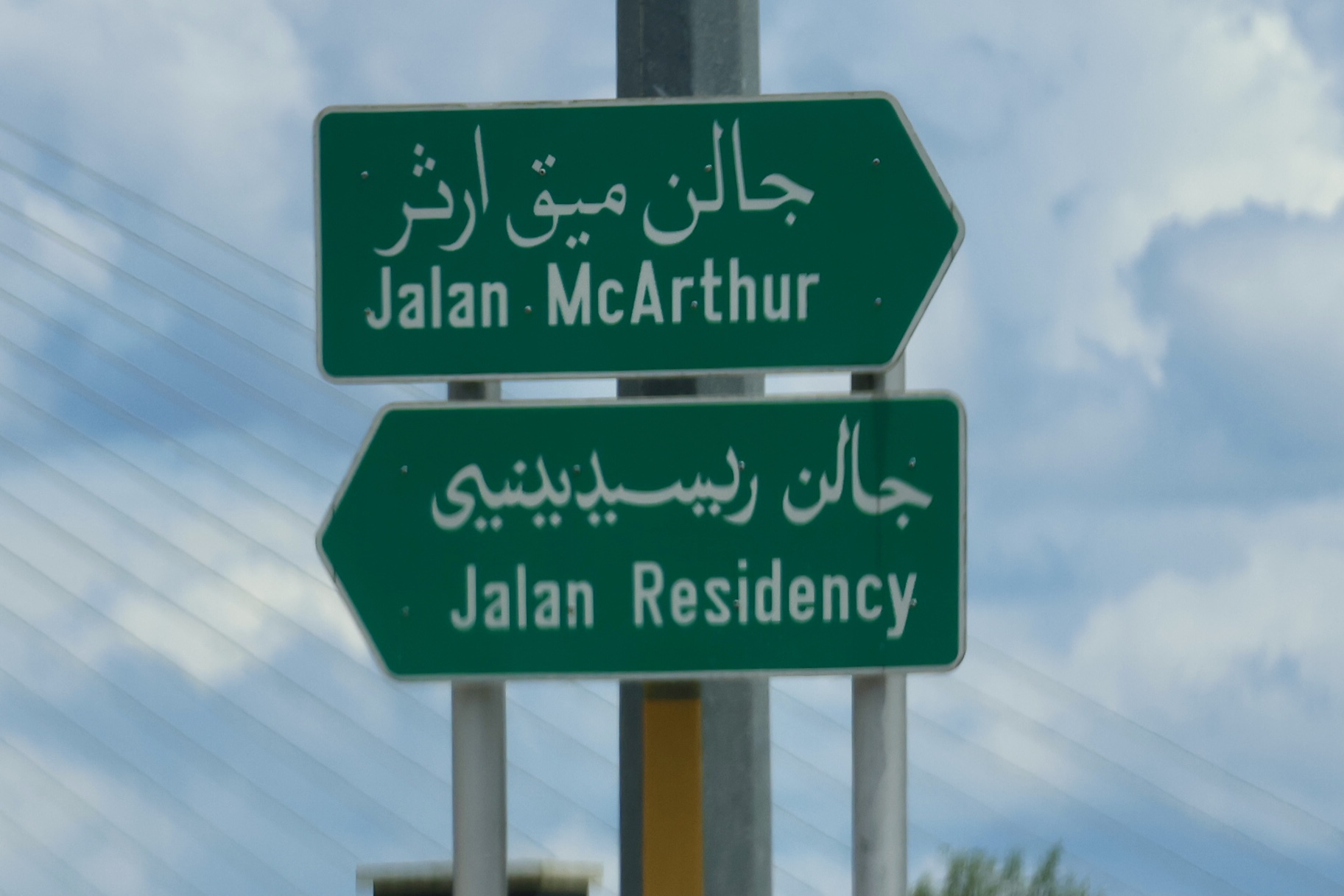
Jalan McArthur in 2023

The people of Brunei views McArthur's report as having considerably greater value since, without his prompt action and the outcome of his work, their now-prosperous nation would barely have survived. Only just a street name (Jalan McArthur) in Pusat Bandar (present day Bandar Seri Begawan) preserves McArthur's legacy and his act of colonisation.

== See also ==
- History of Brunei
- List of administrators of British Brunei
- Sultan Hashim Jalilul Alam Aqamaddin
- Report On Brunei

Diplomatic posts
Preceded by Office established Harvey Chevallier	British Resident to Brunei; January 1906 – May 1907; January 1908 – April 1908	Succeeded by Harvey Chevallier; John Fortescue Owen
