= Protectorate Agreement of Brunei (1888) =

Agreement between Brunei and the British Empire

Protectorate Agreement of Brunei 1888
Agreement between Her Majesty's Government and the Sultan of Brunei for the establishment of a British protectorate over the State of Brunei
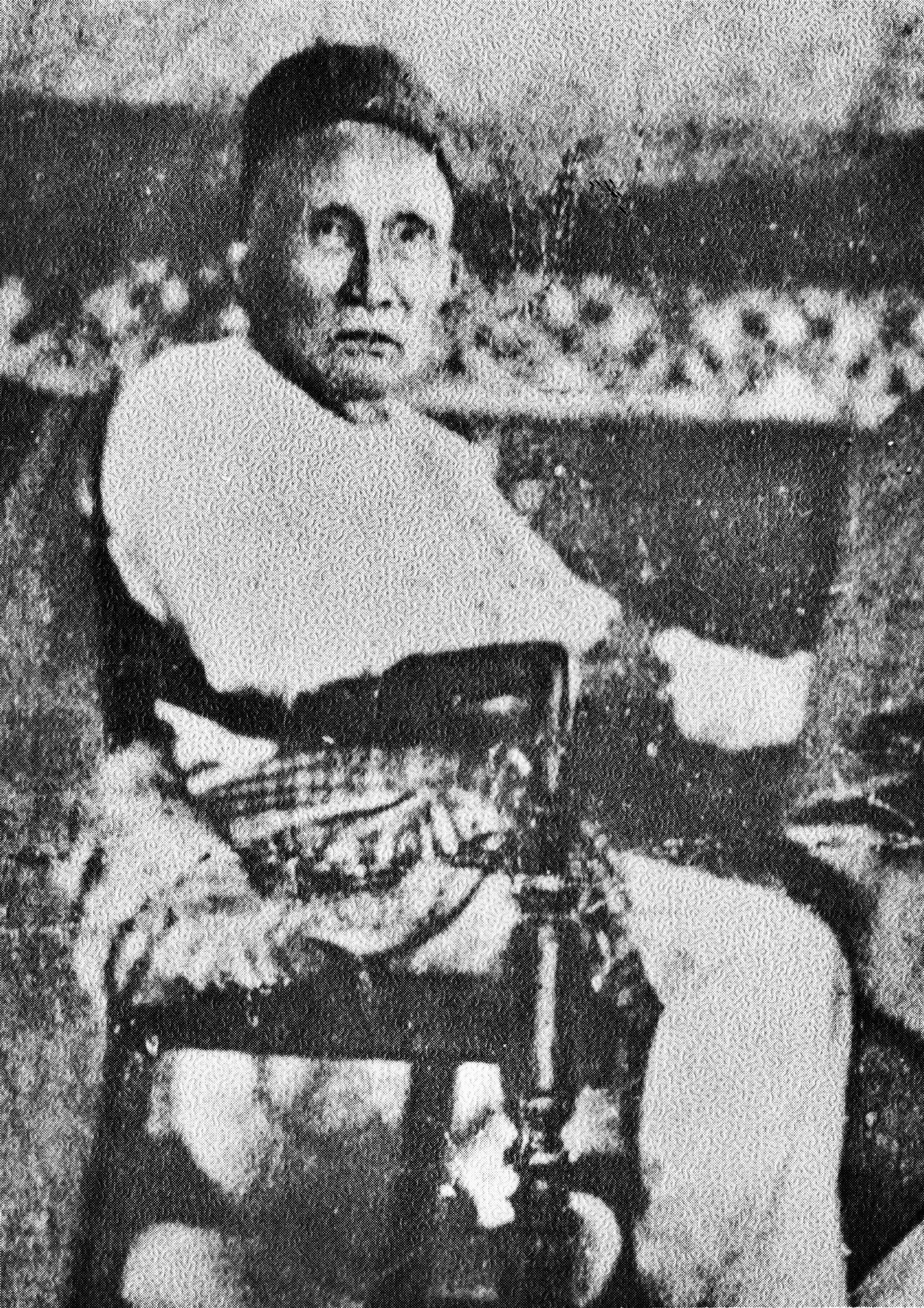
- Portrait of Sultan Hashim in 1888
- Type: Protectorate
- Signed: 17 September 1888
- Location: Sultan's Palace, City of Brunei, Brunei
- Original signatories: Sultan Hashim Jalilul Alam Aqamaddin; Sir Hugh Low
- Parties: Sultanate of Brunei; United Kingdom
- Language: English

The Protectorate Agreement of Brunei 1888 or Protectorate Agreement with the Sultan of Brunei or Agreement between Her Majesty's Government and the Sultan of Brunei for the establishment of a British protectorate over the State of Brunei was a treaty signed on 17 September 1888 between the Sultanate of Brunei and the British Empire. The treaty placed Brunei under the protection of the British Government but with certain limitations, however it effectively shifted the entirety of Brunei's foreign affairs to the United Kingdom.

The agreement was signed by the 25th Sultan of Brunei, Sultan Hashim Jalilul Alam Aqamaddin and the British Resident of Perak, Hugh Low. It was witnessed by Dato Temenggong Kim Swee and L.H Wise. It was signed at Sultan Hashim's palace in "the city of Brunei", present day Kampong Ayer.

The treaty marked the end of the Sultanate of Brunei and the beginning of British Protectorate Brunei. It also officially established the British consul system in the Sultanate. The Protectorate system would later develop into a British Residency system after the Report on Brunei. The system would eventually dissolve and be replaced by a Brunei administration in 1959.

== Structure and content ==
The Protectorate Agreement is structurally simple with only a preamble, eight articles and a witnessing clause all together. The agreement is virtually identical to the protectorate agreements with the North Borneo Company and Brooke led Raj of Sarawak.

The terms of the Protectorate are as follows:

- The preamble sets out that Sultan Hashim as the lawful ruler of Brunei had represented to the British Empire with the desire to be placed under British protection.
- Article 1 establishes that Brunei will continue as an independent state and will be governed by the Sultan and his successors. Establishes that British protection does not confer a right for the British to interfere with the international administration of Brunei:
- Article 2 establishes that any disputes arising from the succession of the Sultanate will be referred to the British Government.
- Article 3 establishes that Brunei's foreign relations will be conducted through or according to the British Government. Including conflicts between Brunei and other states.
- Article 4 establishes that Britain has the right to establish Consular Officers in Brunei, who will be officially recognised by the Sultan and have privileges usually granted to consuls.
- Article 5 establishes that British subjects will have the same rights and privileges as Brunei subjects in commerce and other economic activities in addition to any other advantages that are secured by treaty.
- Article 6 establishes that the Sultan cannot cede any territory in Brunei to any foreign state or subjects of states without British consent. This restriction does not apply to ordinary grants or leases for business, agriculture and residence.
- Article 7 establishes that Britain retains full legal authority over British subjects and British protected foreign nationals in Brunei in civil and criminal matters. If legal disputes arise between British subjects and Bruneian subjects the court will be held in the defendant's nationality.
- Article 8 establishes that all provisions that existed prior to the Protectorate will be maintained unless it conflicts with the current Agreement.

== History ==
Brunei from 1870 to 1888 was at a state of terminal decline. Territories were being wrestled away by Sarawak and the North Borneo Company, for example Brunei had lost the Trusan river, Padas Klias and Lawas, whose annexation was acceded by the British Government.

By 1885, the British Government was considering the partition of Brunei between the North Borneo Company and Sarawak. This view was in part due to Consul-General Peter Leys' report on the River of Borneo. Leys proposed that the only territories to remain with the Sultan and his officers to be that of the Brunei River and Muara. Additionally, the British Government was anxious to prevent other colonial powers from establishing a strong foothold in Borneo, the most imminent threat being the Dutch who were present in the South of Borneo, as well as worries about German and French intervention following their growing colonial and commercial ambitions.

In 1886, Colonial Secretary Granville supported a protectorate over Brunei, Sabah and Sarawak on the basis of Leys' recommendations. After further consultation the Colonial Office and the Foreign Office agreed on a plan for the Brunei question. It was agreed that Leys' partition formed the basis, with the establishment of political protectorates. A special commissioner was to be sent to observe the situation in the states.

In 1887, Sultan Hashim appealed to the British Government not to allow more cessions of Brunei territory. This was because the final determinant of legality for territorial cession was under the jurisdiction of the British Government. This was established in Article 10 of the 1847 Treaty of Friendship and Commerce between Britain and Brunei.

Accordingly, the British Government sent Sir Fredrick Weld, the Governor of the Straits Settlements who was tasked to investigate and write a report on Brunei. Weld, unlike Leys before him was sympathetic to Sultan Hashim's position and recommended a protectorate system in the same style as the Federated Malay states; along with a British Resident to assist the Sultan in administration. Sultan Hashim was receptive to the idea of a protectorate but more hesitant to the Resident proposal. Nevertheless, the Sultan was ready to agree if it meant Brunei's survival as a state.

The Colonial Office was not satisfied with Weld's suggestion and believed his insistence on a Resident and administrative protectorate financially impractical. Instead the Colonial Office opted for a simple protectorate and adopted Leys' original partition scheme. A Resident was not put in place as the Colonial Office believed that with the partitioning going ahead, a Resident would be unnecessary. Lord Salisbury, the head of the Foreign Office had some reservations and noted that Sarawak and Sabah were "crushing out" Brunei and thought it would be best to not make any agreements that would "stand in the way of a consummation which is inevitable". Sir Henry Holland, the secretary of the Colonial Office argued for the protectorate, pointing out that the plan would not interfere with the final absorption of Brunei.

On 17 September 1888 after negotiations with Hugh Low, Sultan Hashim signed the British Protectorate Agreement. The partitioning of Brunei was not as extensive as Leys' proposal and the Sultan was able to keep the Belait, Tutong and Temburong rivers along with the capital and Muara, with Limbang under nominal rule. Similar protectorate agreements were sent to Sarawak and North Borneo both of whom had signed it by 1888.

In 1905, British Consul Malcolm McArthur and the British Resident of Negeri Sembilan Donald George Campbell were sent to re-negotiate the terms of the 1888 Treaty with Sultan Hashim. The new agreement was a blueprint for the early years for a Residency system in Brunei. Unlike the 1888 Treaty, the new agreement provided the British Resident with powers of administration and government.

== Analysis and effect ==
Modern Bruneian scholars, Dr Haji Awang Asbol and Dr Haji Brahim have criticised the treaty as being biased and heavily favouring the British. They note that the articles contradict each other, for example Article 1 states that any British meddling with internal administration is not permitted, however, Article 2 states that the succession of the Brunei throne will first have to be referred to the British Government, effectively undermining the mostly internal process.

This view of an unequal treaty is inline with the intentions of the British Government, L.R Wright notes that while the agreements provided that no internal affairs will be interfered with, the important provision for Britain would be control over the foreign relations of the three states. He posits that Britain was more concerned about preventing other colonial powers from establishing claim in the north of Borneo and to secure Britain's position as the dominant imperial power. Brunei's absorption by its two neighbouring states were deemed a foregone conclusion by the Foreign and Colonial Office.

Sultan Hashim had accepted the protectorate agreement with the idea to prevent further loss of territory, however, this was not how the British officials had seen it. According to Nicholas Tarling: "What the Foreign Office wanted was some authority that would not intervene extensively, but might control the relations in particular of Raja and Sultan". Thus, British priorities were much less concerned about Brunei's territorial struggles than what Sultan Hashim might have believed. Graham Saunders notes that "The Protectorate Agreement proved an almost immediate disappointment to Brunei" and in 1890-1895, Brunei witnessed the full occupation and loss of Limbang by Sarawak, carving Brunei's remaining territories into two separate parts.

Article 4 provides Britain with the right to establish Consulate Offices in Brunei. The British consuls were to provide advice and aid to the Sultan in matters of governance. However, the consulate system was not effective and in the view of Sultan Hashim was largely there to aid Sarawak.

From the day I set my hand to the Treaty of Protection [17 September 1888], I have not once received assistance or protection from Your Majesty's Government and I beg, with all deference, for your Majesty's help. Not a single Consul has done anything to help strengthen my country. They all seem to help Sarawak and to try to hand over my country to Sarawak.

— Sultan Hashim Jalilul Alam Aqamaddin to King Edward VII

This sentiment is supported by the activities of Consul Godfrey Hewett, who was described as "notoriously pro-Brooke". He had negotiated with the Sultan to sell the rights of the Tutong and Belait rivers to Sarawak, arguing that "the disturbances in Brunei could only be settled permanently if the districts came under the control of Sarawak". Malcolm McArthur in his Report on Brunei echoed Sultan Hashim's sentiment and stated that "many of the reports submitted in the past appear to me to have been somewhat misleading".

== See also ==
- British Protectorate Brunei
- History of Brunei
- List of Administrators of British Brunei
- Malcolm McArthur
- Report On Brunei
- Sultan Hashim Jalilul Alam Aqamaddin
- Sultanate of Brunei
