= Report On Brunei =

British report on Brunei

FO 572/39, also called Report On Brunei or Report On Brunei in 1904, was a report written by British Consul Malcolm Steward Hannibal McArthur on 5 December 1904 in Singapore to the British Foreign Office. It concerned the social and political climate of British Protectorate Brunei and how the British foreign policy should proceed. The report also covers Brunei's economy, government structure, social institutions and territorial disputes in the Limbang claim.

FO 572/39 was McArthur's final report to the Foreign Office in his Brunei series and was pertinent to the future of the Sultanate. Britain had considered partitioning Brunei between neighbouring Sarawak and Sabah, under Rajah Charles Brooke and the North Borneo Chartered Company respectively. McArthur's report instead argued for the continuation of Brunei under British protection, and proposed the implementation of the Malayan British Residency system to reform the country. The report succeeded in persuading the Foreign Office and McArthur was installed as the first British Resident of Brunei in 1906.

The report was crucial to the survival of Brunei as a nation-state and has been referred to as the most important document of modern Brunei history. The British Residency would exist until 1959, before being replaced by a Brunei administration.

== Background ==
=== Mission overview ===
McArthur was commissioned to Brunei on 22 April 1904 for three months, where he was tasked to study the conditions of the sultanate and to confirm reports received by the government concerning the "unsatisfactory character" of the Brunei administration. These reports were provided by previous consuls to Brunei, who supported the partitioning of the country to Sarawak. Reasoning that the Bruneian people were better off under the White Rajah's governance over the local administration, which was oppressive and unjust. However, the Foreign Office was not content with the reports and doubted their impartiality and trustworthiness.

McArthur was specifically tasked to investigate complaints surrounding Sultan Hashim Jalilul Alam Aqamaddin and his officers. The Foreign Office advised McArthur to warn the sultan that Britain may not "stand in the way of the Rajah" from absorbing Brunei if the administrative conditions were as bad as reported.

McArthur's appointment was met with resistance from Rajah Charles Brooke, who protested to the Foreign Office that a "reliable report" on Brunei's administration would not be able to be produced in less than one or two years, due to McArthur's inexperience dealing with Bruneian officials. Of whom Brooke described as "an accomplished set of flatterers and liars". Nevertheless, the rajah's representation was discarded and McArthur's mission went ahead.

=== Commencement of mission ===
McArthur reached Brunei on the 3rd of May 1904. He was granted audience with Sultan Hashim the following afternoon, before falling ill shortly after. Due to the illness and the difficulty in traversing Brunei, McArthur was granted an extension to his mission.

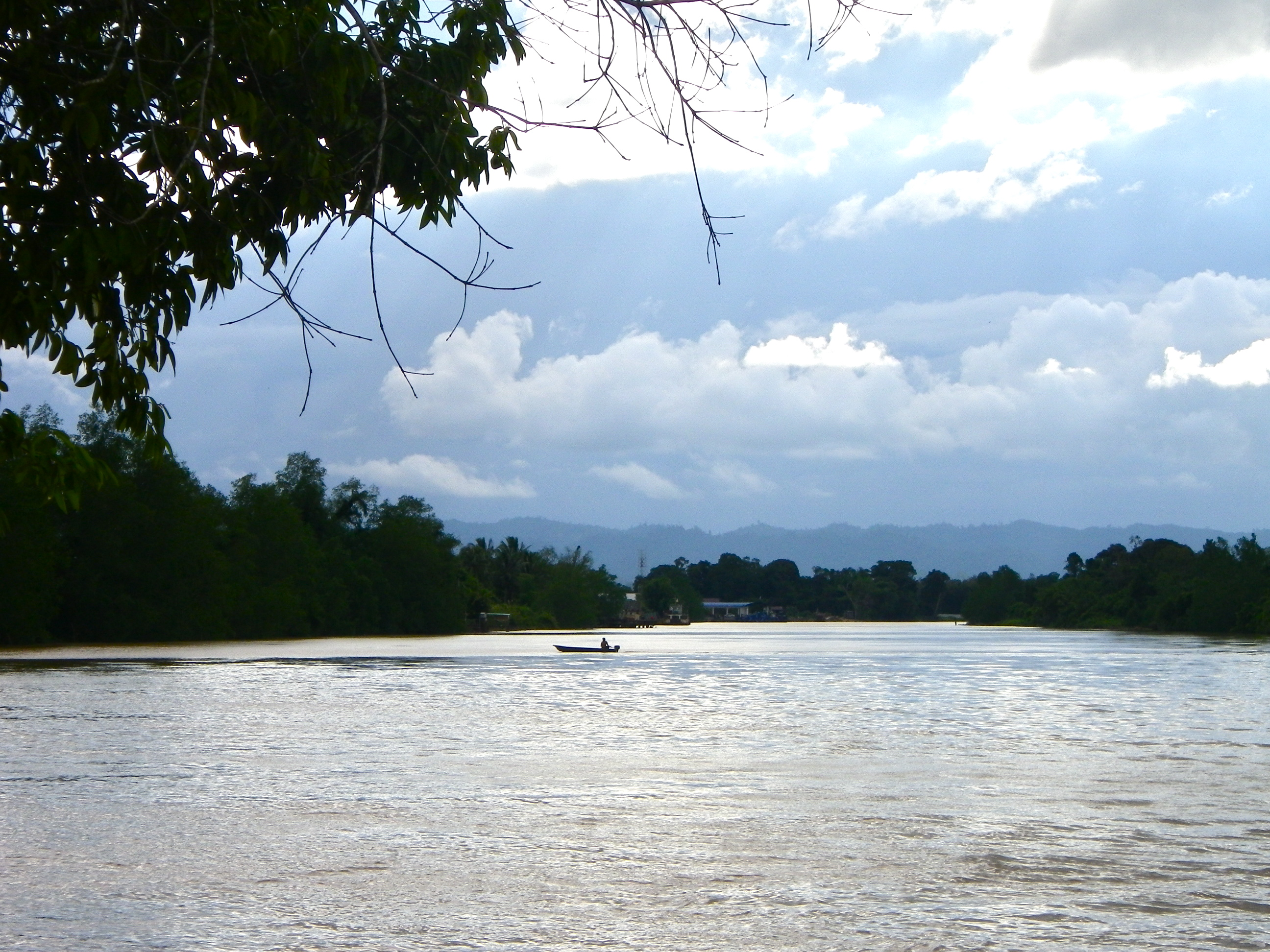
McArthur visited Limbang which was annexed by Sarawak, he referred to it as Brunei's rice store and most valuable asset.

In May, McArthur spent his time studying the archives and meeting with the pengirans (nobles). The consul would also pay a visit to Limbang and Berembang Island. In June and early July, he toured the Belait and Tutong districts to collect information regarding local satisfaction with the current administration. These districts were previously reported to be exploited and were used as examples of popular resentment against Brunei governance by Rajah Charles Brooke. The consul wrote his impressions of the districts and their situation to the Foreign Office on 14 July 1904.

From July to August, Kampong Ayer, then the capital of Brunei was suffering from a smallpox epidemic, where the peak death toll was 60 deaths a day. Towards the end of July, medical assistance was summoned from Singapore and three doctors remained in Brunei throughout August. Due to the epidemic, McArthur's stay was extended even further.

From September to November, McArthur continued to collect general information about the sultanate and within these months he visited the Temburong and Lawas districts. McArthur departed from Brunei on 10 November 1904 to Singapore, where he prepared and completed the report on 5 December 1904.

== Structure and content ==
The report can be divided into two sections: section 1 (paragraphs 1-102) concerns the present state of affairs in Brunei and section 2 (paragraphs 103-146) concerns McArthur's recommendations for the future of Brunei.

=== The state of affairs ===
==== Physical Geography of Brunei (paragraphs 1 - 26) ====
This section of the report concerns the geography of Brunei. McArthur provides contextual information about Brunei territory, with emphasis on what has been lost to Sabah and Sarawak. He also commented on Brunei's climate, soil, minerals, communications, constitution, districts, population and trade.

Of note, McArthur stated that Brunei had no roads and all travelling was done by water. Additionally, he commented with the loss of Limbang, communication between districts was difficult as the Limbang river was the main waterway of Brunei. He expressed that if Britain had appreciated the "intimate connection of Brunei and Limbang" then British acquiescence to its annexation would have been with "greater hesitation".

He also provided commentary on the constitution of Brunei government which he refers to as "despotic in theory" but in practice as "semi-independent fiefs acknowledging one head", owing to the division of Brunei into property; that being the Kerajaan, Tulin and Kuripan.

McArthur described key features of the Brunei (now called Brunei-Muara) and Temburong districts. Within the districts he described The Laboh (now called Mukim Labu), the Brunei River, Brooketon (now called Muara), Buang Tawar River, Kota Batu, Brunei Town (now called Bandar Seri Begawan), Subok and Limau Manis. All of which have historical or economic importance to Brunei. Subok for example was the location of the Island Trading Syndicate's cutch factory, cutch being the most important export of Brunei until the discovery of oil in 1929.

==== Human geography of Brunei (paragraphs 27- 53) ====
McArthur dedicates a significant portion of the text on the various peoples in the sultanate. He covered the Brunei Malays, Kedayans, Bisayas, Muruts and the Chinese. He noted the plights of the local citizenry, referring to the Murut, Kedayan and Bisayas as serfs and victims of oppression. He expanded on the Bisaya, of whom "complain bitterly of poverty and distress" owing to the demands they face by government officials, such as dagang serah or forced trade.

However, McArthur remarks that "they seem no worse off than the average Brunei Malay" but attributes this to their "greater industry" not from a misrepresentation of their exploitation. He also comments on the poverty of the Brunei Malay which he suggests resulted from the loss of economic opportunity from Limbang, which now levies heavy tax on foreign traders.

In reference to the aristocracy McArthur was highly critical of them:

The Pengirans, or aristocracy of Brunei, deserve special mention, not for their engaging qualities, but because they are largely responsible for the present hopeless condition of the country, and for most of the cruelty and rapine usually attributed to the Sultan. It is no exaggeration to describe them as a class as incorrigibily idle and constitutionally dishonest.

Report on Brunei, Paragraph 37

They have been living with increasing difficulty for years on the proceeds of this gradual disintegration of the State, being too lazy or too incompetent to do an honest stroke of work. They are now on the verge of destitution, and are eking out an unjustifiable existence by what they can extort from Kadayans or Bisayas subject to them, and by what they can rise from the sale of odds and ends of personal property and household goods. What they will do when these are exhausted is merely a matter of surmise. They form the dangerous and discontented element in the population, and are always scheming and intriguing, being in the happy position of having no stake in the country and nothing to lose whatever may happen.

Report on Brunei, Paragraph 37

McArthur provides a breakdown on Brunei's trade which he obtained through the traders themselves, he notes that it may be unreliable. He excludes Temburong from his data, citing the negligible amount of trade that occurs as his reason. The remaining three districts are as follows:

Region	Imports	Exports
Brunei	200,000	196,000
Belait	20,000	30,000
Tutong	11,000	20,000
Totals	236,000	246,000

==== Politics of Brunei (paragraphs 54- 86) ====
In this section McArthur discusses the political situation of Brunei and from them the major flaws that exist within the sultanate. In particular he discusses the Brunei Government, ruling class, succession of the throne, Limbang and Lawas.

McArthur describes his major concerns with the sultanate, in reference to the government he notes that there is a lack of central authority. He comments that there was "no Government in the usual sense...only ownership". Where the Sultan has no real power except over his own districts, which was still undermined by the property rights of other Bruneian chiefs. The consul states that "nominally he is supreme throughout Brunei. In practice tulin or kuripan holders do as they like in their own districts".

In terms of institutions and infrastructure McArthur notes that there were no salaried officers and "no forces, no police, no public institution, no coinage, no roads, no public builidings...no gaol". He further expands on the judiciary whom he believes serves "little justice".

In his comments on the ruling class, McArthur reiterates that his acquaintanceship with the aristocracy was unpleasant and that power they possessed "naturally lends itself to the gross acts of cruelty and oppression". One of them was the Pengiran Bendahara who he found to be "greedy, cunning, unscrupulous and cruel". He noted that he was "one of the chief reasons for disaffection on the Limbang" and that he "seems to take no interest in his duties...and shows no loyalty to the Sultan".

McArthur reserves a portion to Sultan Hashim who unlike previous consuls, he was more favourable towards. He notes that Sultan Hashin has "lost any power of initiative or decision he may once have possessed" and has become stubborn at least when dealing with the British Government. The consul suggests that the "disregard of his Treaty obligations is the result of the unsympathetic way in which...he has often been treated".

In relation to the Limbang question, McArthur emphasised how the loss of Limbang impacted Brunei Town and expressed that he is “unable to agree with the remarkable statement…[that] the occupation of the district has conferred a benefit on the population of Brunei”. The consul explains that Brunei trade with Limbang was subject to various restrictions and taxes which "have tended to destroy that trade with the Limbang and to accentuate the injury caused to Brunei". He affirms his position that the loss of Limbang "has been the final step towards the ruin of Brunei" but admits the impossibility of its return.

==== Finances of Brunei (paragraphs 87-97) ====
In this section McArthur discusses the resources of Brunei and its revenue. The resources he discusses are the following: coal, mineral oil, antimony, jungle produce and population. He notes that the only coal mine in the country is located in Brooketon but that it "does not pay". Nevertheless, it remained a valuable asset to Brunei.

In terms of revenue, McArthur finds difficulty in differentiating between "personal perquisites, the result of ownership. and revenues which would...accrue to the government". This is due to the lack of institutions like a land administration. Instead, "customs and licenses is taken, throughout the country, by monopolies of trade. The consul estimates the Sultan's treasury at 23,977 strait dollars but suggests it could be 25,000 per annum, calculating the figures from cession and poll tax money.

==== General Summary ====
McArthur justifies the length of his report as a means to correct the inaccuracies of previous consuls. He also clarifies his sympathies towards the Bruneian people despite finding little to admire from the sultanate itself.

I fear that my that my report is inordinately long, and possibly in many respects trivial. My excuse must be that nearly all my preconceived ideas of Brunei have been upset during my residence in the State, that the different conditions in each district and among each class of the population appear to require separate descriptions, that many of the reports submitted in the past appear to me to have been somewhat misleading.

Report on Brunei, Paragraph 98

At the same time I must express the hope that, in my endeavour to avoid the exaggerations which seem to me to characterize some of the accounts I have read, I have not fallen into the opposite error of minimizing the grave evils which undoubtedly exist. It must be remembered that, even if the actual condition of the country is not as bad as has sometimes been stated, there is nothing to prevent the possibility of the most ruthless cruelty and extortion becoming at any moment a fact. The state of affairs which I have tried to depict temperately in the preceding pages appears to me to be sufficiently hopeless to make all exaggeration unnecessary. When it is remembered that these evils flourish under nominal British protection, and that it is that protection alone which keeps Brunei in existence as a separate State, it seems obligatory on His Majesty's Government to take some steps to ameliorate them.

Report on Brunei, Paragraph 100

However unfitted Malays may be as a race for the responsibilities of Government, and however exceptional the depravity of the Brunei aristocracy in this respect may be considered, it is only fair to them to remember that the decay of Brunei may be in great part attributed to purely natural causes.

Report on Brunei, Paragraph 101

=== The Future ===
The remaining length of the report is reserved to answering the question of Brunei's future. McArthur argues that the state of affairs of Brunei warrants British intervention and if none is given it will likely lead to the final loss of Brunei's independence. He continues by saying that a laissez-faire policy would not be effective and that without direct British intervention the condition of the country will continue to grow worse and increase the suffering of its citizens. He urges the British government to adopt a definitive policy for the future and proposes alternatives to the current regime:

(i) To support the present regime, trusting the personal influence of a Consul on the spot to prevent or check abuses

(ii) To encourage the British North Borneo Company to acquire what remains of Brunei

(iii) To consent to the absorption of Brunei by Sarawak

(iv) To establish British protection

==== Consulate system (paragraph 104) ====
McArthur argues against this proposal and believes the system will fail. He states that even if the consul is able to always influence the sultan, it is impossible to exercise control over the districts under the present regime.

McArthur also doubts the ability to create a consistent and efficient government under the present conditions of Brunei. He explains that advice from the consul can be ignored owing to the 1888 Treaty which forbids interference in internal administration. He elaborates that complete reorganisation of government is required to achieve satisfactory results. For example, the system of oppression is necessary for the present regime to function and that no revenue is available for public purpose. McArthur concludes that the consulate system is impractical.

==== British North Borneo (paragraph 105-107) ====
McArthur rejects ceding Brunei to the British North Borneo Chartered Company. He states that the Brunei Chiefs were "favourably disposed" towards the Company, adding that they have often been subject to "adverse comment". He discusses the Company's aims as a government, which he describes as "frankly commercial" and that the taxation was heavier than a British Colony. McArthur recalls his visit to the Company's Province Clarke, noting that he "found far greater poverty and distress than in Brunei" and that complaints of oppressive taxation was common. The consul was not overly negative towards the Company, he admits that the subject races might be better off with them than Brunei. He also admits that possession of Labuan would mean the Company would have more efficient control over the districts than the present regime. However, McArthur doubts if the Company would have sufficient capital to develop and administer Brunei successfully. He points out the "neglect everywhere apparent in Labuan" and how the Company has not consolidated their territories. His final line of reasoning is that the argument for cession to the Company was far weaker than to Sarawak, concluding that the future of Brunei must lie between Sarawak and British Protection.

==== Sarawak (paragraph 108-133) ====
McArthur dedicates a large portion of the section arguing against the Sarawak proposal. He notes that it was the option that had the most support in the Foreign Office, mentioning the British Government’s "tacit encouragement" and "very active assistance" from Consuls in Brunei. He explains the benefits of absorbing Brunei would bring to Sarawak, such as accruing Brunei's revenue and resources as well as having his "hold on the Limbang...be legalized". He continues by saying that Sir Charles' government would have the ability to administer Brunei easier than the other alternatives. However, he states that the Rajah is "generally disliked and distrusted in Brunei" and that since the seizure of Limbang he has become their "avowed enemy".

McArthur explains that this dislike also stemmed from the Rajah having "broken all his pledges". For example, the Rajah promised that no duties will be imposed to the detriment of Brunei regarding trade with Limbang, this promise was not kept. He concludes with:

The rancour of the Brunei people may perhaps be considered baseless and unreasonable, but it would be idle to deny that it exists and that it is an obstacle to any real friendship

Report on Brunei, Paragraph 113

McArthur then states that the resistance may also be due to a strong cultural and national identity. He explains by saying with the dissolution of the Brunei Government, the territory would merely become a district. He says that the Sultan "is intensely proud of the past history of Brunei and so, apparently, are his people" and that the Brunei people realise that cession would "mean the blotting out of an ancient dynasty". He ends by stating that this sentiment is strong enough to mould their government policy.

McArthur then discusses the reputation of the Rajah, who was known as a great governor for Malays. He explains that this was a misunderstanding as the Rajah has "never yet had an opportunity of controlling a really Malay population" and in fact Brunei's Malay population was averse to Sarawak. He expands by stating that the Brunei Malays believed that the Rajah has "no consideration shown to Malays" and instead favour Dayaks. The Brunei Malays were also terrified of the Dayaks, whom the Rajah gives freedom for suppressing disturbances and do not enjoy the idea of living in that kind of administration.

McArthur then provides an analysis on his predecessor, Consul Godfrey Hewett's negotiations for the sale of Brunei to Sarawak, which in Hewett’s view was a generous offer. The offer was 12,000 Strait dollars per annum to the Sultan and 6,000 per annum to the Officials, where half is given to their family. McArthur notes that the Hewett had overlooked the existence of tulin rights and that the revenue offered to the sultan and the officials would in reality be "considerably reduced". He expands by disagreeing with Hewett's sentiment that the terms had "extraordinary generosity" and expressed that it instead appeared to "deprive the present Rulers of Brunei"" and casts doubt that the settlement would be a satisfactory safeguard for the families either, commenting that "they would become mere pensioners with a crowd of relations and dependents to support".

McArthur concludes that even if the terms were more generous, it would still be rejected owing to the lack of support the Sarawak offer has in Brunei. McArthur believes that no offer by the Rajah "would ever be welcomed by the Brunei Government". He continues that the only reason why the Brunei Government entered the 1888 treaty was to prevent Sarawak aggression. From this treaty McArthur argues warrants the Brunei Government to claim a "sympathetic consideration of their views as to the future of their country".

McArthur then addresses arguments in favour of handing Brunei to Sarawak from the British point of view, whereby it would be the option which the British government would be relieved from responsibility without expense and would alleviate the suffering of the subject races and that they are far better equipped to administer Brunei than the other options. He explains that the only argument against this is that cession to Sarawak is the only solution that will not be approved by the Brunei government and its people. Moreover, McArthur points out that the Brooke regime will change hands and that the establishment of Sarawak rule in Brunei will be handled by Rajah Muda Charles Vyner Brooke, who was untested and lacked the reputation of his father's governance.

==== British Protection (paragraph 134-146) ====
McArthur posits the main criteria for the future of Brunei to be twofold: to maximise justice for the oppressed and to minimise interference with the rights of the ones in power. He states that while most of the alternatives can satisfy the justice criterium, all of them will interfere with the rights. McArthur asserts that British protection will meet both of these criteria and the rest will be a question of expense and expedience.

From his discussions with Brunei officials, the proposal of a joint control with Britain will be welcomed, with half of government revenue going to administrative expenditure. He expressed that the Sultan is "not averse to British protection in its wider sense" and he would "infinitely prefer it to any other change". Adding that they would find it "less obnoxious" than being part of Sarawak or British North Borneo.

McArthur then discusses the logistics of British Protection. He insists that Labuan is needed for efficient control and for ease of transportation. He urges the British government to make arrangements with the Chartered Company. He then addresses expense for British protection, admitting there will be "heavy initial expense". He states that the original land owners of the country in the kerajaan, kuripan and tulin need to be bought out before reorganisation could begin. Which is also the case for other rights such as taxation rights of certain creditors, who would need to trade their rights for a lump sum of money. He is unable to determine with certainty how much it will cost but estimates it to be at least 50,000 strait dollars with reasonable interest.

McArthur does not believe that Brunei can be self-sufficient initially but he does not find it unreasonable to suggest that with Brunei's population, minerals, trade and soil that its future would "ultimately be one of prosperity" if Brunei's issues are adequately addressed. He concludes his report by saying that whether reform is a task for the British Government is not his to decide.

== Aftermath ==
The final bid for Brunei's future became a matter of democratic process, the Colonial Office puts its decision up to a vote. George Fiddes argued against British intervention but many of his colleagues were persuaded by McArthur’s conclusions. Crucially, Sir John Anderson, the High Commissioner of the Strait Settlements and Sir Frank Swettenham, the first Resident general of the Federated Malay States, recommended the British government to follow through and install a resident. The Colonial Office ultimately followed the McArthur's residency proposal.

McArthur was tasked in re-negotiating the 1888 Treaty with Sultan Hashim and was accompanied by Donald George Campbell, Resident of Negeri Sembilan, for the task. The terms of the new Supplementary Agreement were essentially the blueprint for first years of the Residency system. Among them was that "the whole of the administration and the whole powers of legislation and of taxation were to be considered on the advice of the resident".

On 16 November 1905, McArthur and Campbell arrived in Brunei Town. The Sultan was presented a letter from Sir John Anderson outlining the terms. The Sultan responded by stating that "he was always willing to follow the advice of the British Government" and eventually on 3 December 1905, the Sultan and his wazirs attached their seals to the treaty.

In 1906, the British Government appointed McArthur as the first British resident following Swettenham and Sir John Anderson's suggestion. McArthur officially started his duties as the British Resident in January 1906.

== See also ==
- History of Brunei
- List of administrators of British Brunei
- Protectorate Agreement of Brunei (1888)
- Sultan Hashim Jalilul Alam Aqamaddin
- Sultanate of Brunei
