= Jeremy Atiyah =

British travel writer

Jeremy Francis Atiyah (30 December 1963 – 12 April 2006) was a British travel writer.

== Personal life ==
Atiyah was born in Woking, Surrey, England, to legal scholar Patrick Atiyah. From 1970 to 1973, his family lived in Canberra, Australia, before returning to the United Kingdom, eventually settling in Oxford. He was educated at Magdalen College School and later attended Trinity College, Oxford, where he studied Classics before graduating in 1985 with a degree in Philosophy, Politics, and Economics (PPE).

After university, Atiyah's interest in travel led him to teach English in Barcelona. He became a polyglot and learnt Spanish, German, Italian, Russian, and Mandarin. In 1989, a journey on the Trans-Mongolian Express from China to Moscow led to a chance meeting with Xiaosong Que, a Chinese student whom he married in 1991. Atiyah's marriage to Xiaosong Que was dissolved in 2000.

== Career ==
Atiyah began his career in the early 1990s. He co-authored the first edition of The Rough Guide to China, published in 1995. He subsequently became a travel writer for several British national newspapers and served as the first Travel Editor for The Independent on Sunday from 1997 to 2000.

In 2002, Atiyah adopted a nomadic lifestyle, divesting himself of most possessions to travel and write. During this period, he researched and wrote a history of Russian America after spending a winter in Irkutsk, Siberia. In 2005, he purchased and began renovating a property in Puglia, Italy, and started a new venture designing walking tours.
