= Sharif Ali =

Sultan of Brunei from 1425 to 1432

Sharif ‘Alī شريف علي
- Sultan of Brunei; Amir al-Mu'minin

Sultan of Brunei
- Reign: 1425–1432
- Predecessor: Ahmad
- Successor: Sulaiman
- Born: c. 1385; Taif, Sharifate of Mecca (present day Taif, Saudi Arabia)
- Died: 1432 (age 47); Kota Batu, Sultanate of Brunei
- Burial: Mausoleum of Sultan Sharif Ali, Kota Batu, Brunei
- Spouse: Puteri Ratna Kesuma
- Issue: Sultan Sulaiman
Names
- Sharif ‘Alī ibn Sharif ‘Izz al-Dīn Abū Sarī‘ ‘Ajlān ibn Asad al-Dīn Rumaythah ibn Muḥammad Abū Numayy al-Ḥasanī
- House: Qatadids (by birth); Bolkiah (by marriage)
- Father: Sharif Ajlan
- Mother: Sharifah Fatimah (disputed)
- Religion: Sunni Islam

Sharif Ali (Arabic: شريف علي; 1385–1432) or commonly known as Sultan Berkat (the Blessed Sultan), was the Third sultan of Brunei from 1425 until 1432, the year of his alleged death. He ascended the Brunei throne in 1425, succeeding his father-in-law, Sultan Ahmad, who had no male heir. He significantly strengthened Islam in Brunei through his various measures. His efforts not only enhanced his own stature but also benefited the entire Bruneian populace. By reinforcing Islamic principles, he further solidified the Malay Muslim Monarchic concept. As the first Sultan to construct a mosque in Brunei, he is regarded as a pious leader who governed the country in accordance with Islamic law.

== Genealogy ==
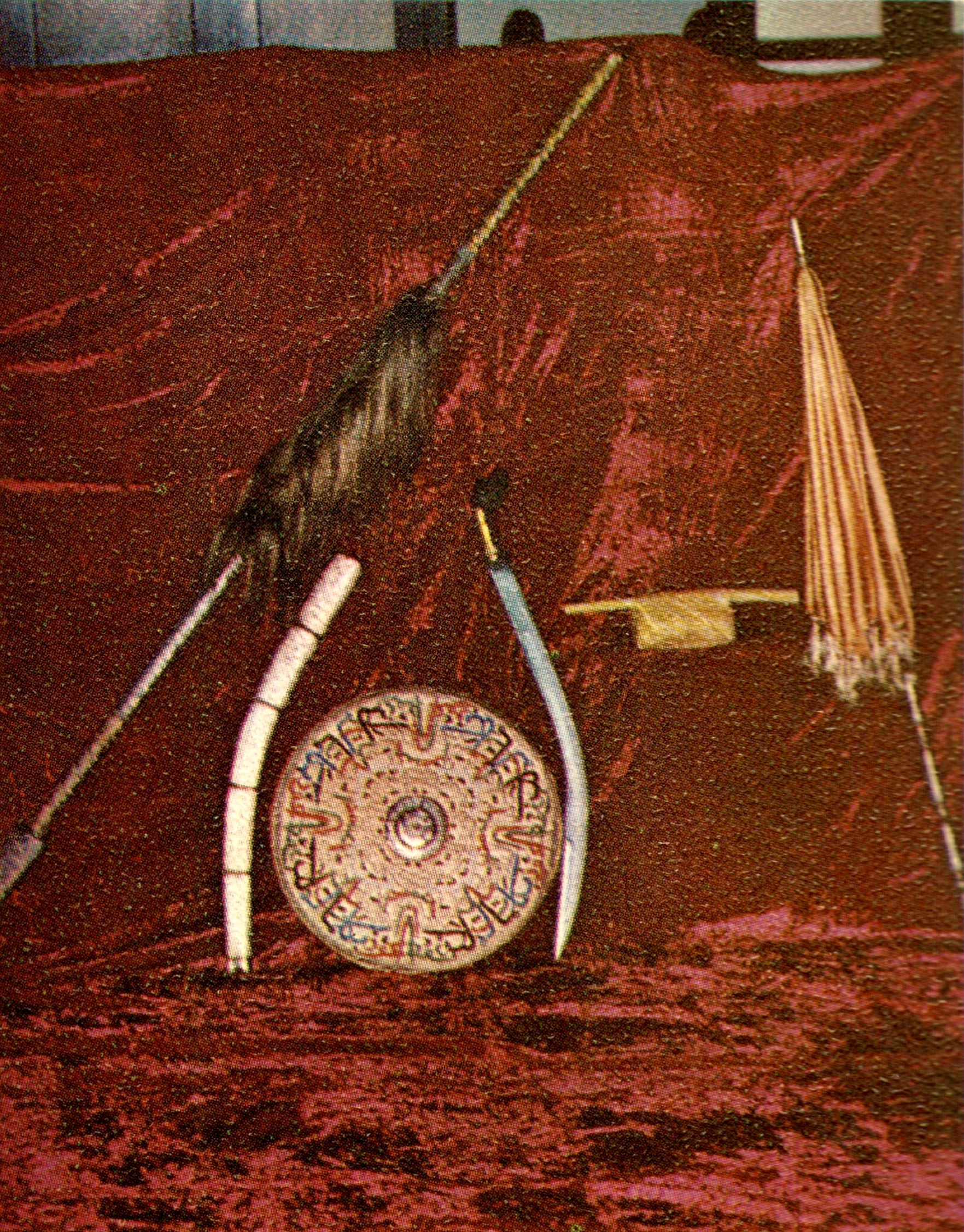
"Pedang Si Bongkok" (centre) and other royal regalia in c. 1968

Sharif Ali, an Arab of Taif descent, was a descendant of Muhammad through his grandson Hasan ibn Ali. (Note: Historical accounts state that Sharif Ali was the son of Sharif Hasan bin Sharif Abu Numaie, a Taif native and descendant of Hasan, Muhammad's grandson.) Known as Al-Amir Sharif 'Ali bin Sharif Ajlan bin Sharif Rumaythah bin Sharif Abu Numayy, and formerly the Emir of Mecca, Sharif Ali's connection to Brunei is symbolised by the "Pedang Si Bongkok," a sword he brought with him. This sword is the sole unambiguous reference to his lineage from his father, Sharif Abu Numaie, and remains a cherished royal artifact in the palace.

== Reign ==
Following the death of Sultan Ahmad without a male heir, the people of Brunei urged his son-in-law, the esteemed Arab missionary Sharif Ali, to ascend the throne. Known for his dedication to spreading Islam, Sharif Ali solidified his ties to the Bruneian royal family by marrying Sultan Ahmad's daughter, Puteri Ratna Kesuma, around 1400, when she was likely a teenager. This timeline aligns with Sharif Ali's arrival in Brunei after TH 797 (AD 1395) and his ascension as sultan in TH 836 (AD 1432).

Sharif Ali greatly advanced Islam in Brunei. Islamic teachings were firmly established in the Malay Muslim Monarchy during his reign, and Islamic laws—such as fasting for Muslims—were introduced while preserving local practices that were in line with Islam. His impact signaled the shift from earlier Hindu-Buddhist influences to a unified Islamic civilisation and established the groundwork for Brunei's Islamic government. Along with establishing the first mosque and affirming the qibla direction, he provided Bruneian Muslims with a central space for communal worship, especially for Friday prayers. He would occasionally deliver the Friday sermon himself, uniting his roles as both ruler and preacher to uphold Islamic principles, a mission he had pursued since his arrival in Brunei. By adding Islamic symbolism to the royal regalia, especially the flag known as "Tunggul Alam Bernaga," Sharif Ali strengthened Islam in Brunei. The flag reflected the pinnacle of Islamic principles in Bruneian culture, with its three wings signifying the pillars of Islam: iman, Islam, and ihsan. "Tunggul Alam Bernaga" also represented the Sultan's might, his submission to Allah's will, and his defence of his subjects. Furthermore, he bestowed to Brunei the title "Darussalam" as a blessing and prayer, expressing a hope for the country's continued success.

As a result of the ennoblement of its tutelary mountain at Sharif Ali's request, Brunei and Malacca became major kingdoms during his rule. When he was given burial arrangements comparable to those of the Sulu kings, this position was further confirmed. Through its embassies, Brunei obtained the changkah, a rare ceremonial sword, during this period. Archaeological evidence indicates that Chinese builders were involved in the construction of the stone ramparts of "Kota Batu," which Sharif Ali designed and asked be built. The Bruneians, known as "islams" because they avoid eating pork, are said to have originated from a man named Sultan Yusuf, who some academics, like John S. Carroll, believe to be Sharif Ali, according to the Boxer Codex. Sultan Yusuf, who ruled Cavin, a city in the Malay-speaking area close to Mecca, departed his country in a number of ships with a large following. He fought against the indigenous Visayans after landing in Borneo, retaining his position as king and ruler over his subjects.

After his death, Sultan Bolkiah and Sultan Muhammad Hasan continued his legacy, contributing to Brunei's political influence and commitment to Islam. His son, Pengiran Muda Besar Sulaiman, succeeded him as Sultan of Brunei.

== His tomb and uncertainties ==
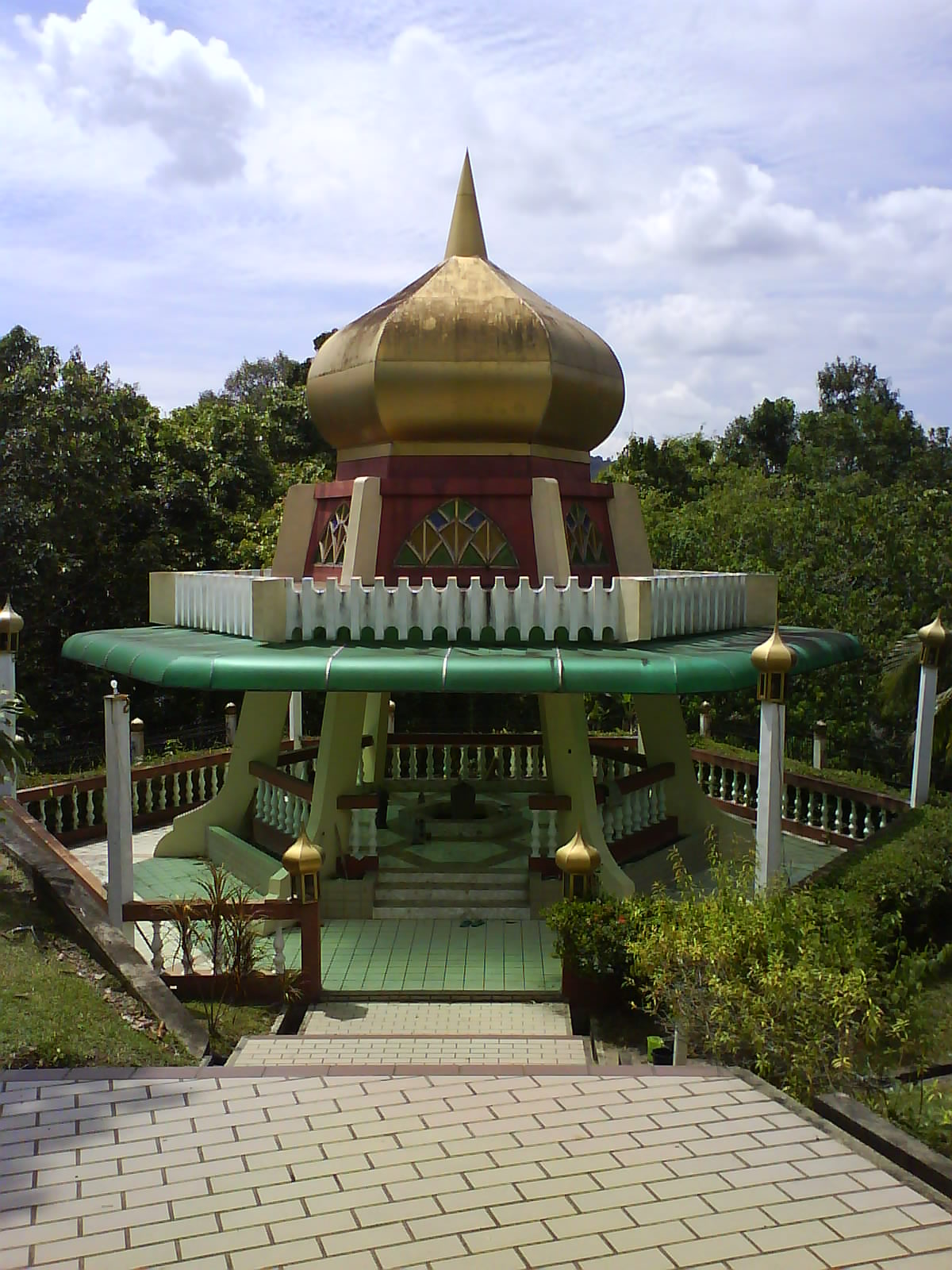
Tomb of Sharif Ali

In Kota Batu, next to the Brunei Museum, is allegedly Sharif Ali's tomb. A trail that connects his mausoleum with Sultan Bolkiah's and passes other historically significant locations leads visitors to the tomb through a wooded region. The route continues in the direction of Kota Batu Archaeological Park, which are named for the remains of a stone fort that have been discovered there.

According to the Bruneian family tree, he died in 1432. This stems from the fact that a modest gravestone, dated A.H. 836 or A.D. 1432, next to the Brunei Museum in Kota Batu, was formerly believed to be his. However, upon closer inspection, it was discovered to be the grave of an Asueri who was neither a sultan nor a sharif. In any event, this sultan's reign would have had to have taken place after 1515. His death date is unknown, and there is no custom that his grave is located in Brunei. It is possible to assume that he began his rule between 1521 and 1524, although this is only guesswork.

== Things named after him ==
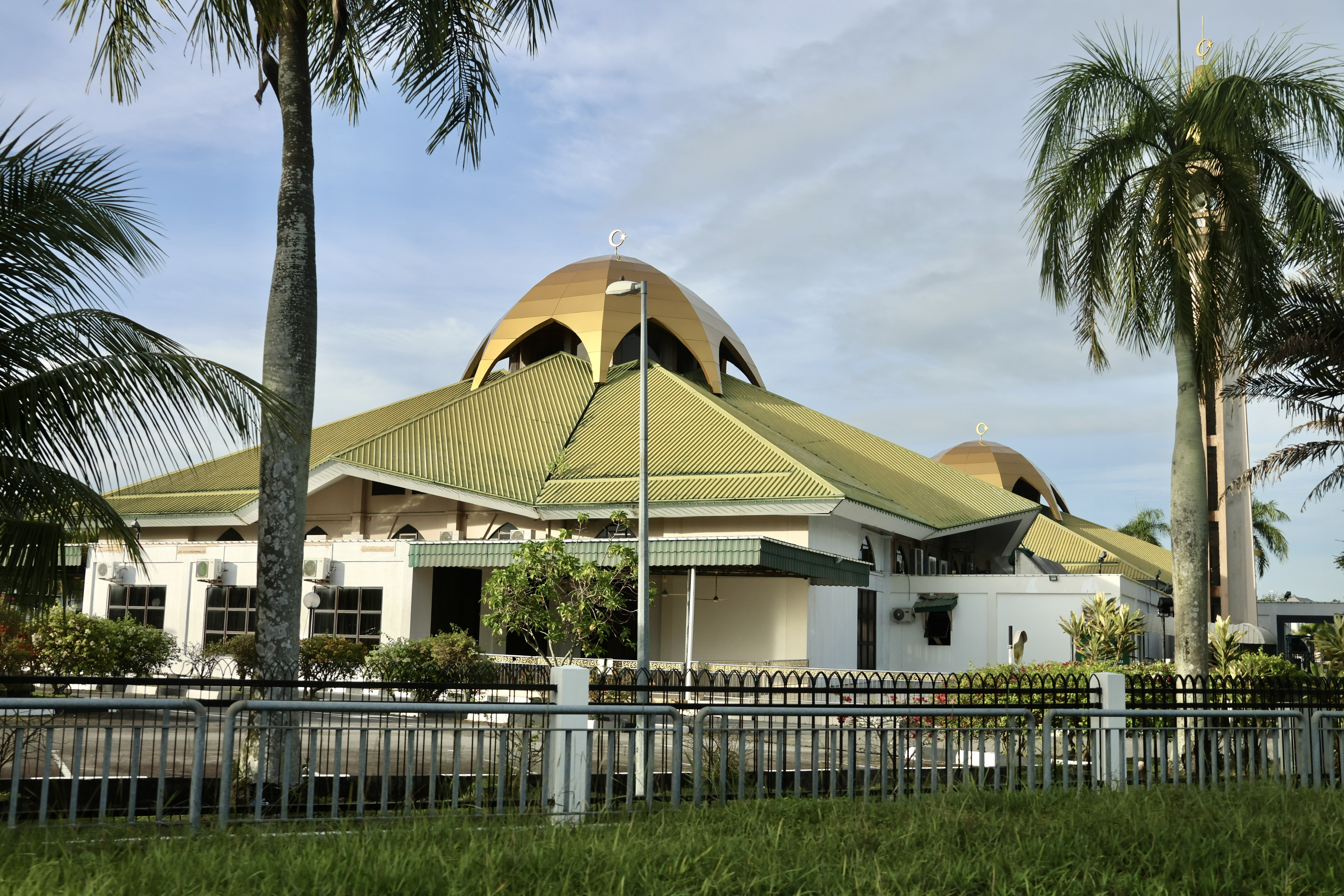
Sultan Sharif Ali Mosque

- Jalan Sharif Ali is a road in Seria
- Sultan Sharif Ali Islamic University is established on 1 January 2007
- Sultan Sharif Ali Mosque in Kampong Sengkurong
- Sultan Sharif Ali Secondary School in Kampong Salambigar

== Notes ==
Regnal titles
| Preceded by Ahmad | Sultan of Brunei; 1425–1432 | Succeeded by Sulaiman |
