= Huabiao =

Ceremonial column in China

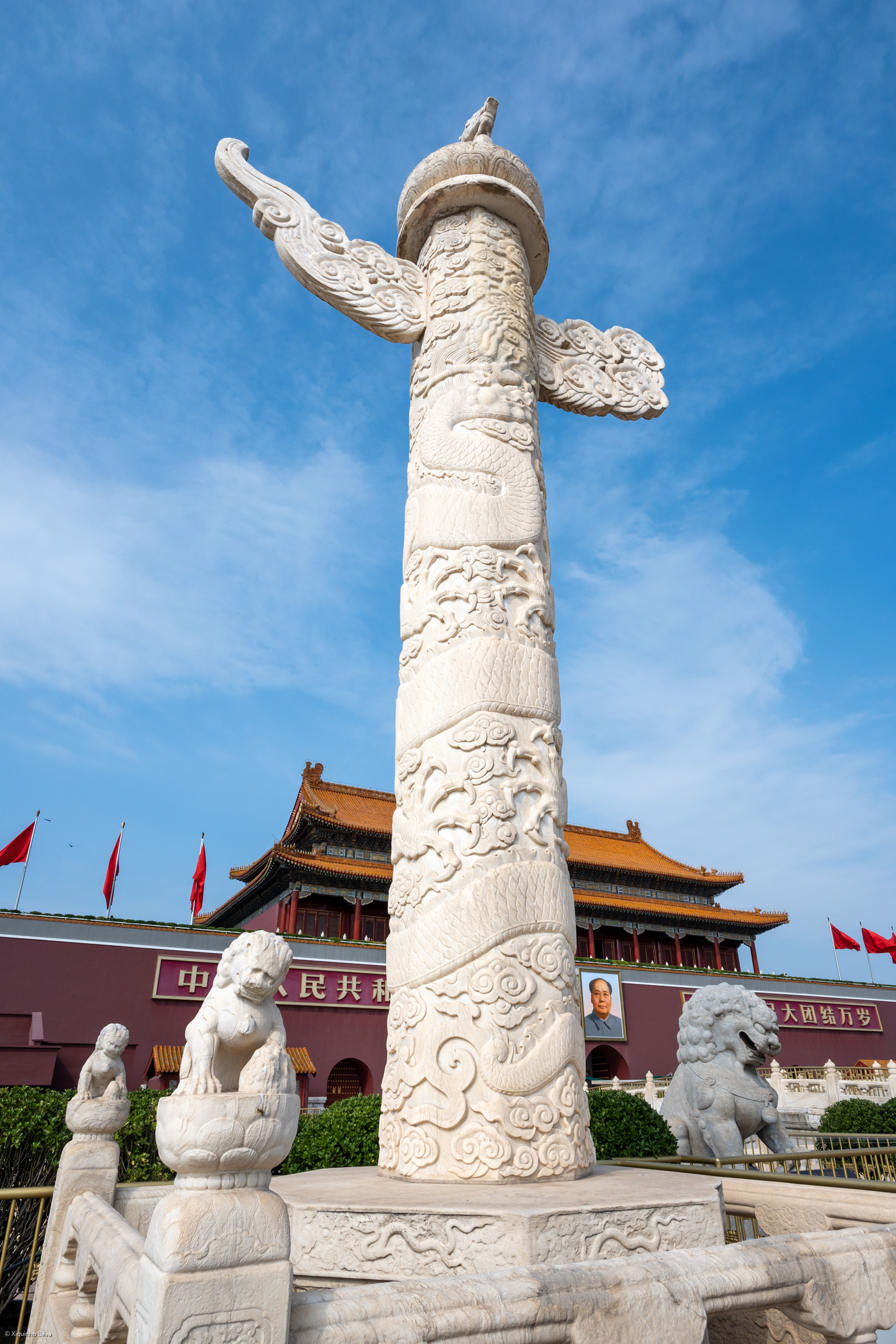
A huabiao in front of the Tiananmen in Beijing.

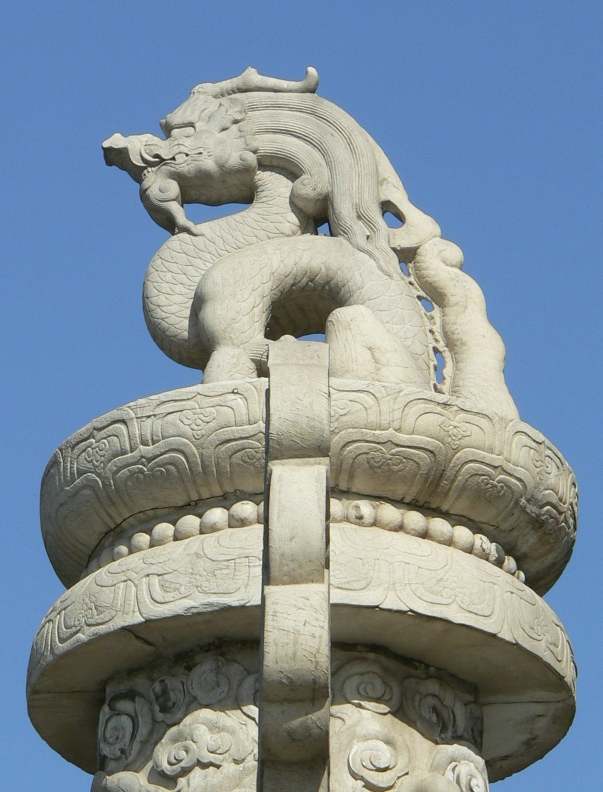
The mythical creature atop a huabiao.

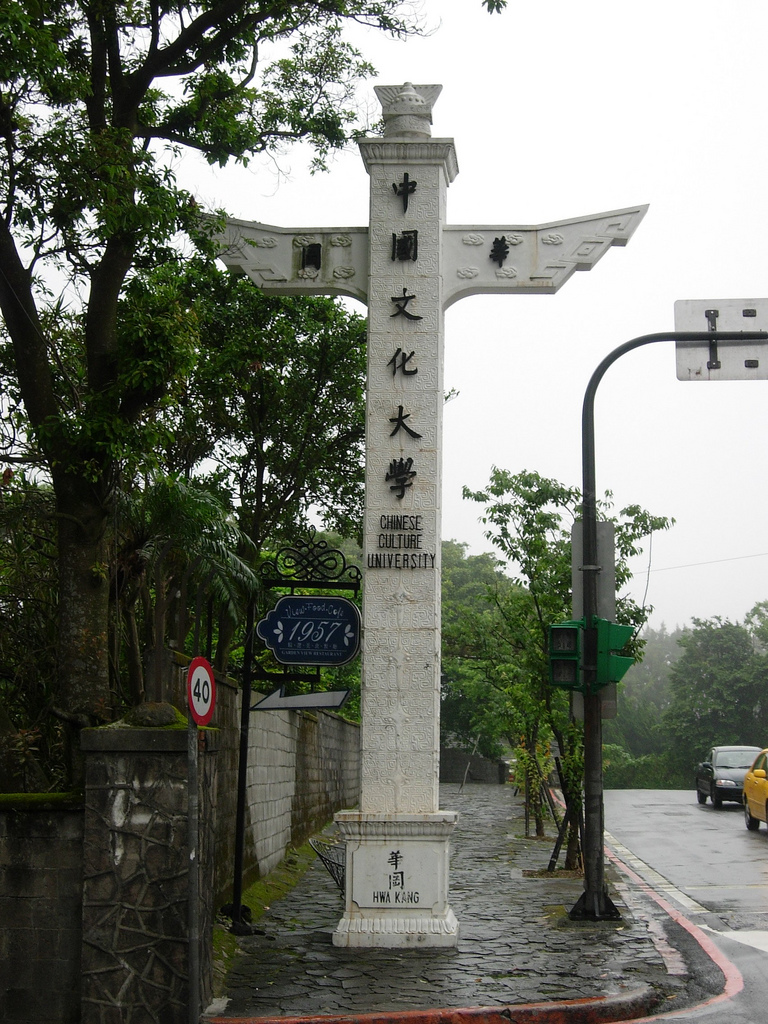
A modern huabiao at Chinese Culture University in Taipei.

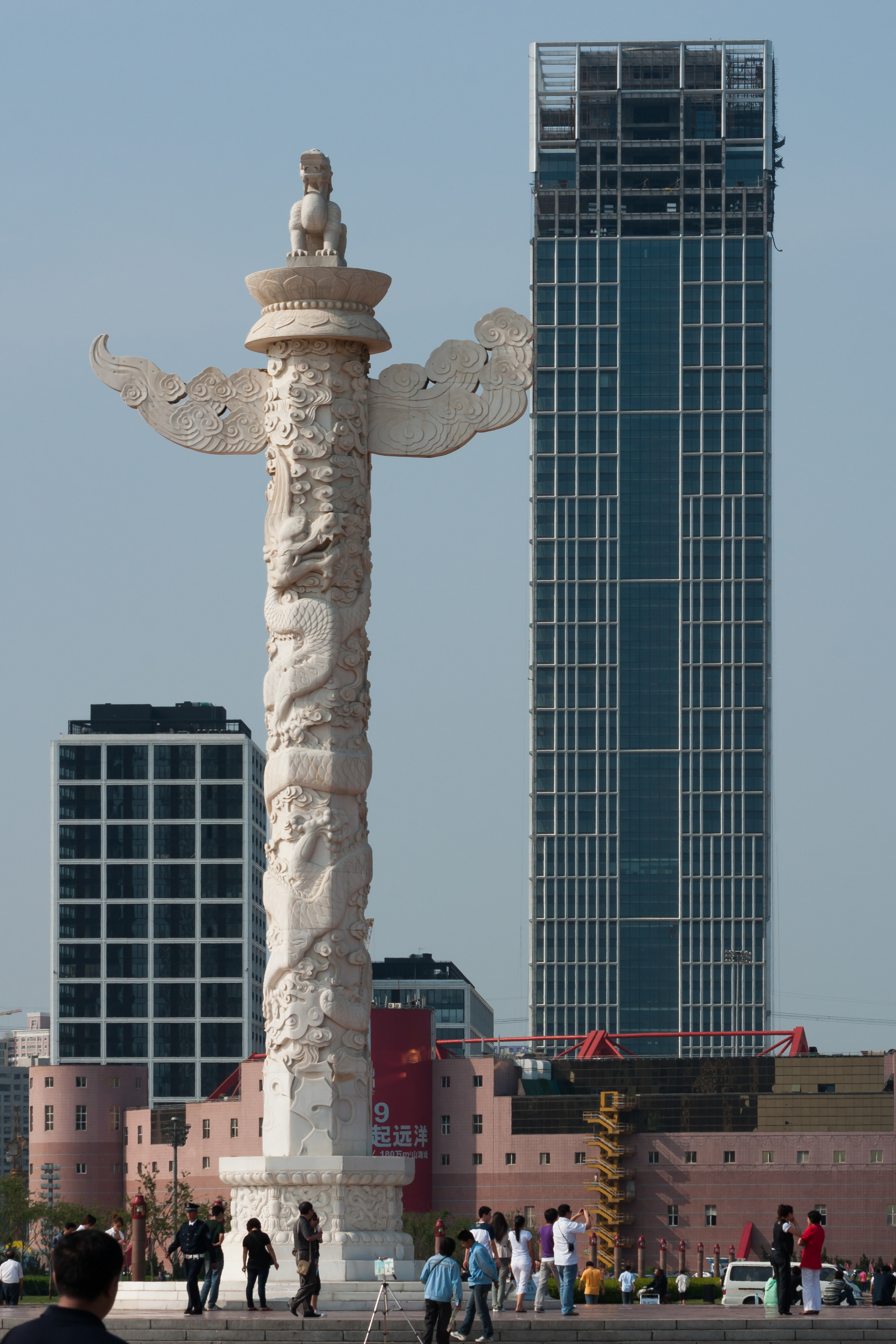
A singular huabiao in Xinghai Square in Dalian.

Huabiao (simplified Chinese: 华表; traditional Chinese: 華表; pinyin: huábiǎo; Jyutping: waa4 biu2; Pe̍h-ōe-jī: hôa-piáu) is a type of ceremonial column used in traditional Chinese architecture. Huabiao are traditionally erected in pairs in front of palaces and tombs. The prominence of their placement have made them one of the emblems of traditional Chinese culture. When placed outside palaces, they can also be called bangmu (谤木; 謗木; Bàng mù; 'commentary board'). When placed outside a tomb, they can also be called shendaozhu (神道柱; Shéndào zhù; 'spirit way columns').

== Structure ==
Extant huabiao are typically made from white marble. A huabiao is typically made up of four components. At the bottom is a square base which is decorated with bas-relief depictions of dragons, lotuses, and other auspicious symbols. Above is a column, decorated with a coiled dragon and auspicious clouds. Near the top, the column is crossed by a horizontal stone board in the shape of a cloud (called the "cloud board"). The column is topped by a round cap, called the chenglupan (承露盤) "dew-collecting plate" (see fangzhu). At the top of the cap sits a mythical creature called the denglong, one of the "Nine sons of the dragon", which is said to have the habit of watching the sky. Its role atop the huabiao is said to be to communicate the mood of the people to the Heavens above.

== History ==
Classical texts in China attribute the beginning of the huabiao to Shun, a legendary leader traditionally dated to the 23rd–22nd century BC. Some say it developed from the totem poles of ancient tribes. The Huainanzi describes the feibangmu (诽谤木; 誹謗木; Fěibàng mù), or bangmu for short, literally "commentary board", as a wooden board set up on main roads to allow the people to write criticism of government policies. However, tradition holds that by the mid-Xia dynasty, the king had moved the bangmu in front of the palace, in order to control public criticism. During the notorious reign of King Li of Zhou, the king would monitor those who wrote on the bangmu, and those who criticised the government would be killed. The practical use of the bangmu gradually diminished as a result of such practices.

In the Han dynasty, the bangmu became merely a symbol of the government's responsibility to the people. These were erected near bridges, palaces, city gates and tombs; the name huabiao arose during this time. During the Southern and Northern Dynasties, the Liang dynasty restored the institution of the bangmu, by installing boxes next to the bangmu. Those wishing to air grievances or to comment on government policies could post their writings in these boxes. However, by this time, the column itself was no longer treated as a bulletin board.

It is thought that, in their use on spirit roads, the huabiao replaced the ornate que towers, which were commonly used during the Eastern Han dynasty (25–220 AD).

== Notable examples ==
Some prominent examples of ancient huabiao that can still be seen today include the following.

- There are two pairs of huabiao at Tiananmen, with one pair located inside the gate, and one pair outside. These were erected in the Ming dynasty in the 15th century.
- Pairs of huabiao flank the spirit way of most of the medieval and pre-modern imperial tombs which survive to this day, including the imperial tombs of the Ming and Qing dynasties.
- A pair of huabiao are located outside the tomb of the Marquess Pingzhong of Wu of the Liang dynasty, located in Nanjing.
- A pair of huabiao originally from the Old Summer Palace in Beijing are now located within the grounds of Peking University (photo)
- Two pairs of huabiao near the Lugou Bridge (Marco Polo Bridge) at the southwestern outskirts of Beijing. One pair is located at the eastern end of the bridge, the other at the western end, flanking the roadway.

In the early 20th century, the huabiao, in a Modernist form, was incorporated into the developing vocabulary of a modern Chinese architectural style. Examples of these modernist re-interpretations of the huabiao can be seen in front of a variety of institutions built during that period, such as Tongji University in Shanghai, or the Sun Yat-sen Mausoleum in Nanjing.

More recently, a trend has developed in some parts of China to create (often enlarged) replicas of the classical huabiao, though not often used in the classical context. For example, Xinghai Square in Dalian, which was built in the 1990s, incorporated a single huabiao at its centre, to commemorate China's resuming sovereignty on Hong Kong. On 5 August 2016, Dalian's landmark huabiao was demolished in secret at 00:30am, as the government considered it as a vanity project of Bo Xilai (a former mayor of Dalian who was arrested in 2013 for corruption). It had been there for 19 years and had become a landmark and symbol of Dalian. Citizens were angry with that, according to taxi drivers in the city and many comments on the Internet by Dalian locals. However, the media and government both remained silent.

During the 2008 Summer Olympics opening ceremony, a pair of huabiao were featured as part of the performance.

== See also ==
- Totem Pole
- Obelisk
- Paifang
