= Sulaiman of Brunei =

Sultan of Brunei (r. 1432–1485)

Sulaiman سليمان

Sultan of Brunei
- Reign: 1432–1485
- Predecessor: Sharif Ali
- Successor: Bolkiah
- Born: Bruneian Sultanate
- Died: 1513; Brunei
- Burial: Royal Mausoleum Jalan Subok, Kota Batu, Brunei
- Issue: Bolkiah
- House: Bolkiah
- Father: Sultan Sharif Ali
- Mother: Puteri Ratna Kesuma
- Religion: Sunni Islam

Sulaiman ibni Sharif Ali (Jawi: سليمان القانوني ابن شريف علي; died 1513), also known as Senior King (Raja Tua) and Adipati Agung (Sang Aji), was the fifth Sultan of Brunei, according to Silsilah Raja-Raja Berunai. He succeeded his father in 1432 and ruled until his abdication in 1485, to allow his son Bolkiah to become Sultan.

Under his reign, Malacca and the eastern region of Southeast Asia saw Brunei grow into a powerful imperial force. In addition, he was the first sultan to be in charge of building a mosque in addition to being the architect of Kota Batu. According to oral tradition, the sultan was said to live more than 100 years old. In the Boxer Codex, he was known as Sultan Soliman by the Spaniards.

== Reign ==
Pengiran Muda Besar Sulaiman, Sharif Ali's son, succeeded him after his death in 1432. During his reign, he continued the legacies of his father in strengthening the spread of Islam and the construction of Kota Batu. Although there are several ideas about how the Brunel Legal Code came to be, its provisions were put into effect under his father's reign and following ones. For instance, two royal siblings were charged with having incest sex. Sultan Sulaiman passed a judgement, ordering the construction of an underground cell, the confinement and execution of the defendants. From these indications, Sultan Sulaiman fairly applied the law to all defendants no matter their status or affiliation with the royal family. Even during his rule, royal relatives who disobeyed Islamic teachings faced harsh punishment regardless of their position or rank.

In 1485, he abdicated in favour of his son, Bolkiah. His title was then changed to Paduka Seri Begawan Sultan, and was still alive when the Spanish invaded Brunei in April 1578, and they referred to him as the Raja Tua. Sultan Sulaiman died in 1513, and his tombstone is located the Royal Mausoleum Jalan Subok. The inscription his tombstone mentions the name of the sultan and the date of his death.

== Personal life ==
Sultan Sulaiman had the following issue:

- Sultan Bolkiah, 5th Sultan of Brunei

== See also ==
- Greater Sunda Islands
- List of sultans of Brunei

Regnal titles
Preceded by Sharif Ali	Sultan of Brunei; 1432–1485	Succeeded by Bolkiah
