= Sacred way =

Ornate road leading to a Chinese tomb of a major dignitary

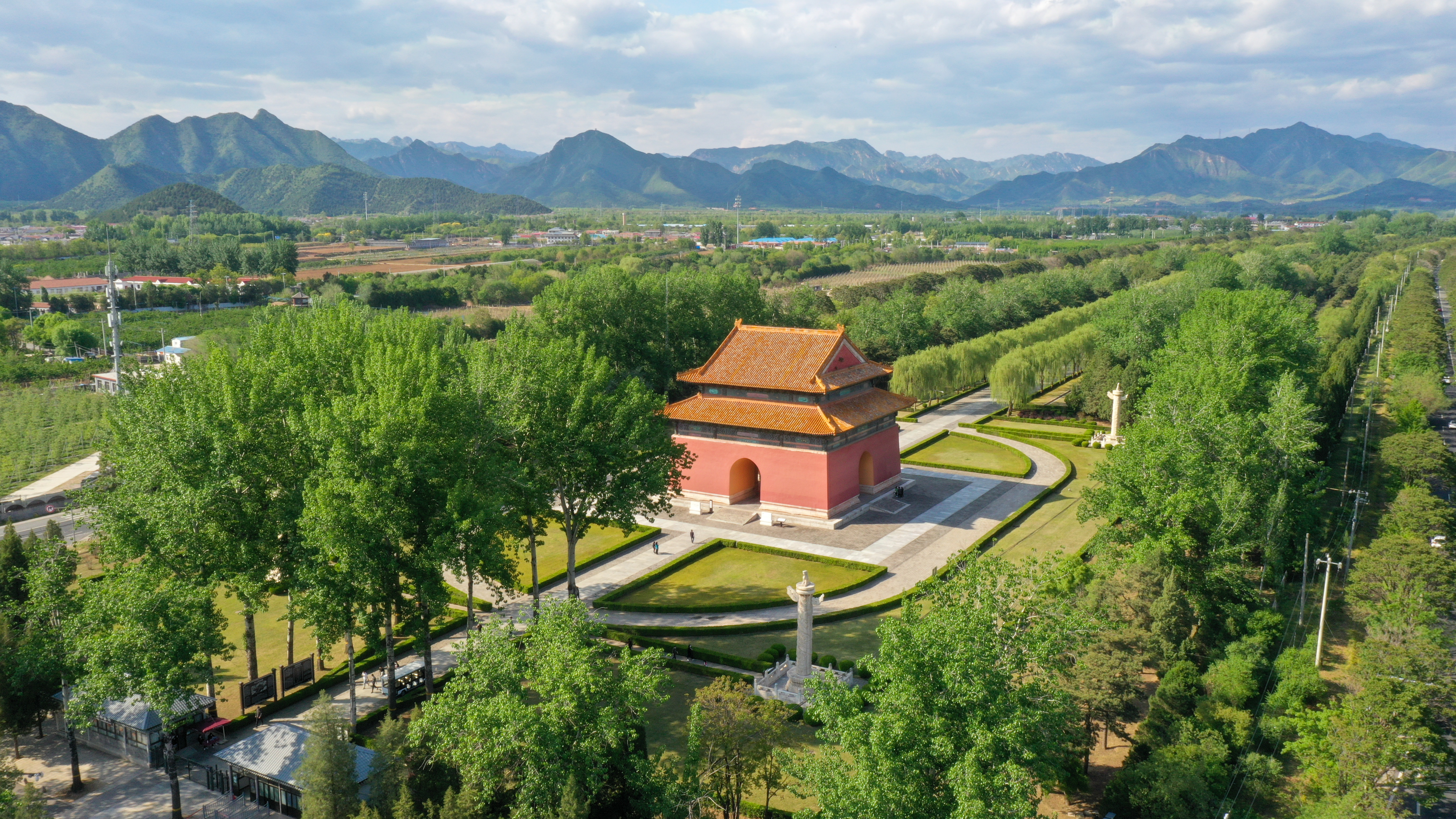
Spirit way at the Ming Dynasty Tombs outside of Beijing.

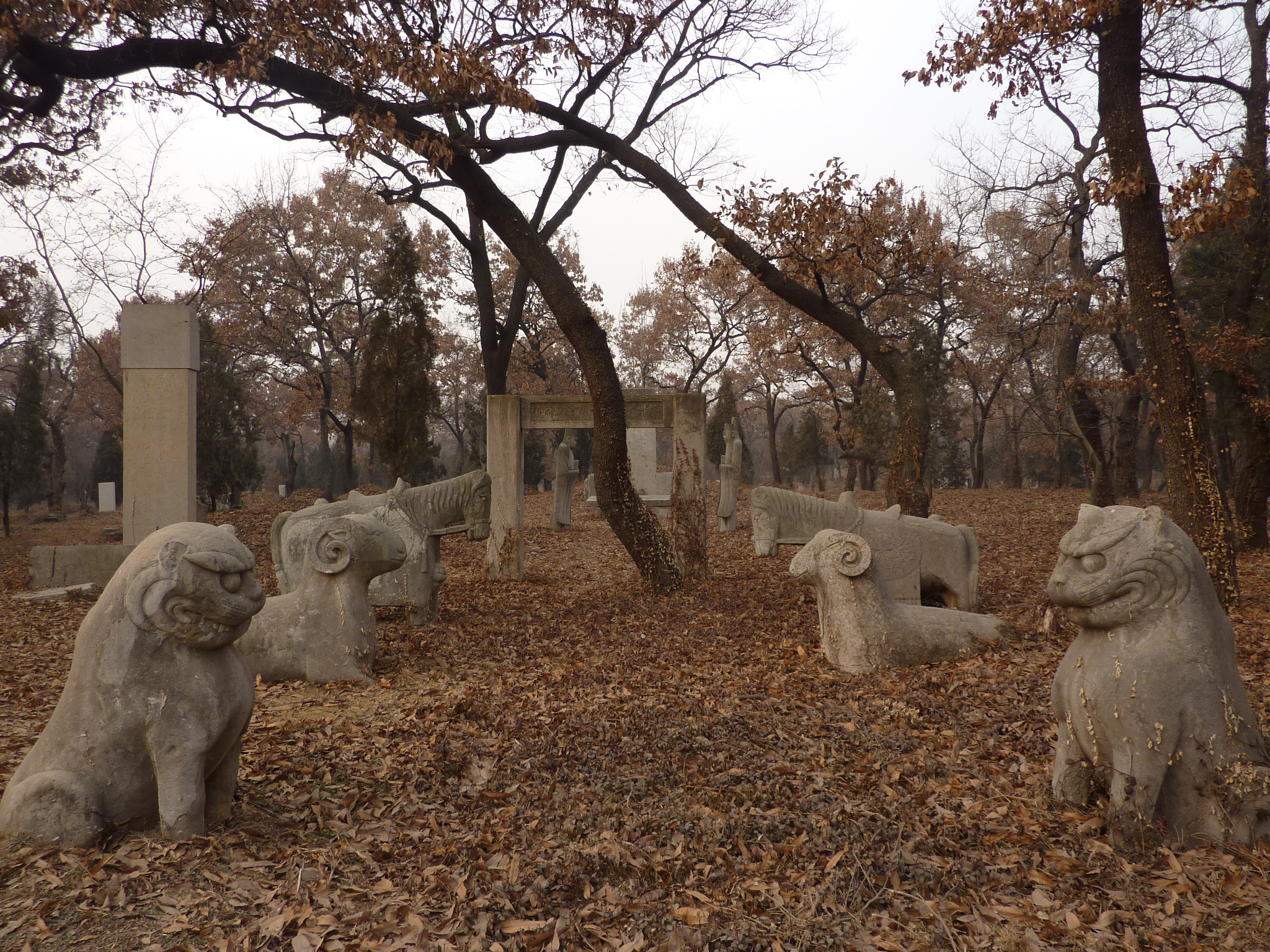
Spirit way of Kong Zhengan in the Cemetery of Confucius

A sacred way, spirit way, spirit road, spirit path, etc. (神道, shéndào) is the ornate road leading to a Chinese tomb of a major dignitary. The sacred way is lined on both sides by a succession of statues, pillars, and stelae. The statues along the spirit way depict real and mythical animals, as well as civilian and military officials.

== History ==
=== Eastern Han dynasty ===
Sacred ways were a well-developed feature of tombs by the time of the Eastern Han dynasty. A traditional burial site of an emperor or a high official of that era would be typically arranged along the north–south axis; the sacred way would lead from the south to the southern gate of the enclosure within which the tomb itself and the associated buildings were located. This layout, with few exceptions, has persisted since then through the entire history of the sacred way.

A characteristic feature of an East Han sacred way were monumental towers (que), which were much larger and more expensive than the statues and stelae. The que were followed by statues of animals, among whom feline-like creatures were prominent: both fairly realistic-looking tigers (long known to Chinese artists) and lions (a Han dynasty innovation), as well as more fantastic varieties, provided with wings, beards, and/or horns. The feline-based fantastic creatures were known under a variety of names, among which the most common were tianlu, bixie and qilin. As in later dynasties, the creatures were facing the road, and were designed to be primarily viewed from the sides. There is no definitive information about any elephants appearing on Han dynasty sacred ways; however, it is speculated that an ancient stone elephant (which may have originally been part of a pair) 2 km south of the Eastern Han imperial mausolea near Mangshan (in Luoyang area) may have been associated with those mausolea: the two elephants may have marked the entrance to the mausoleum area.

As on the later sacred ways, the stone animals on the Eastern Han sacred ways must have been followed by human statues, but very few of those have survived. A pair of well-preserved stone officials from that period are now kept at the Temple of Confucius, Qufu.

The last component of the Eastern Han sacred ways, the stelae are believed to be a stone reproduction of wooden slabs, which in the ancient times were placed on both sides of the open grave during the burial. The coffin was lowered into the grave on ropes passed through holes made in each slab. After the burial, those wooden slabs would be placed upright on top of the tomb, with appropriate text written on them. In reminder of that old custom, early sacred way stelae have a round hole in the middle of their upper parts.

=== Southern Dynasties ===
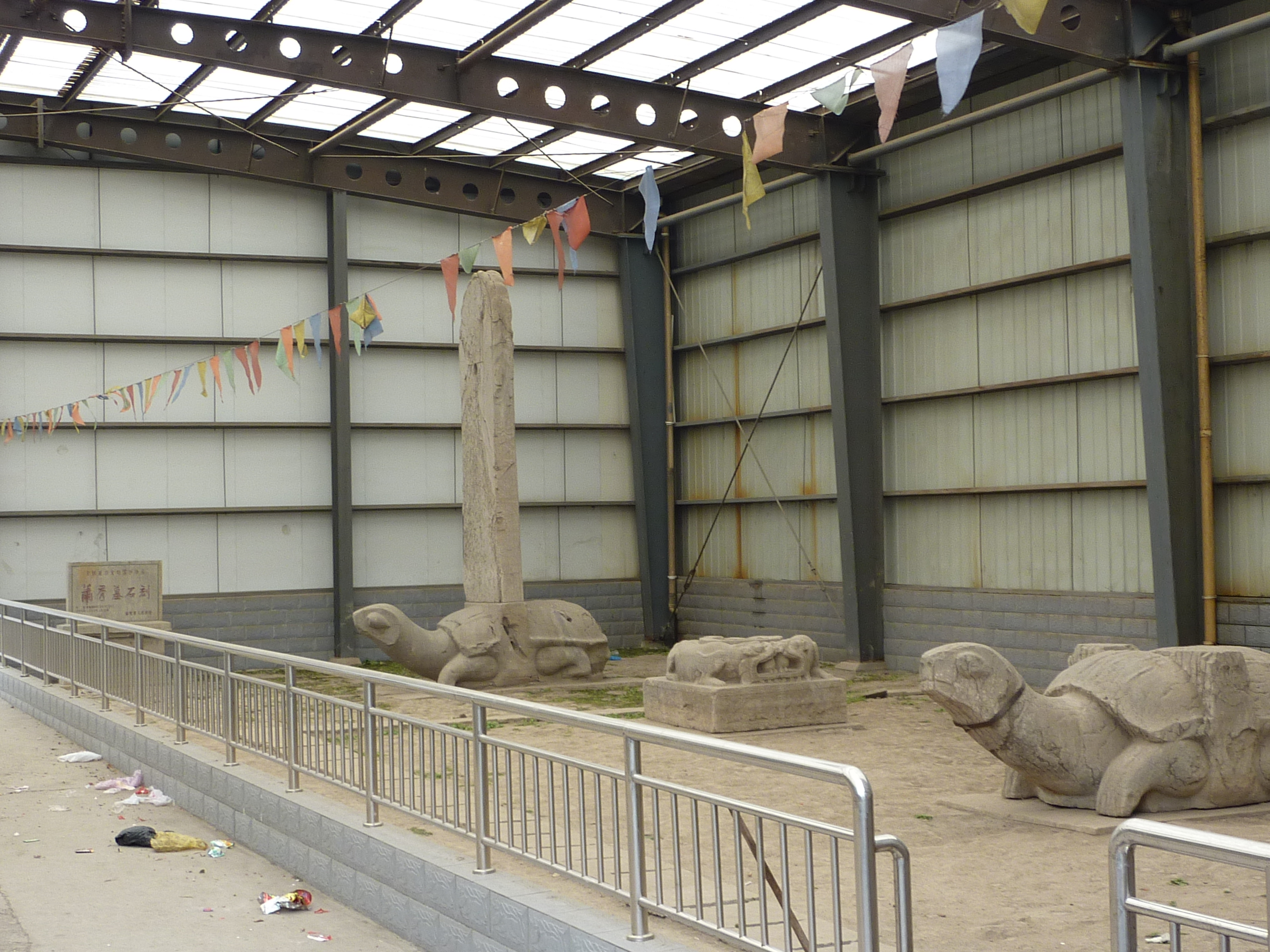
Two of Xiao Xiu's stele-bearing turtles, and the base of one of the two columns

The fall of the Han Empire was followed by a period of upheaval, when China was divided between a number of short-lived Southern and Northern Dynasties. The Wei and Western Jin rulers (3rd century AD) seemed to have frowned upon funeral art extravagance of the fallen Han dynasty, generally shunning above-ground statuary at their tomb sites. Literary sources attest to the resumption of the sacred way construction already by the time of the Eastern Jin (4th century AD), but the surviving sacred way statuary from the "period of disunion" pertains almost exclusively to the last four of the six Southern Dynasties: Liu Song, Southern Qi, Liang and Chen, which were usually centered around Jiankang (today's Nanjing). Around thirty of their tomb statuary groups, in various degrees of preservation, are known to modern researchers. They are located primarily in the eastern and southeastern suburbs of Nanjing (Qixia and Jiangning Districts) and in Danyang, farther east.

The Southern Dynasties regimes, with their smaller economic base than the mighty Han, did not create as numerous and as grandiose funeral ensembles as the Qin and Han. The use of sacred ways under these dynasties was limited to emperors and their close relatives. The new Buddhist and Daoist currents in the spiritual life of south China greatly influenced the art of sculpture as well. In the words of the art historian Ann Paludan, in Daoism-influenced art, "Han emphasis on spatial relationships, forms, and limits was rejected in favour of flowing lines suggesting flexibility, a lack of clear-cut boundaries, and endless motion". The newly reinterpreted feng shui principles called more attention to orienting the tomb with respect to the terrain than to the strict north–south axis.

A typical Southern Dynasties sacred way was quite short and included a pair of giant (3–4 m tall) winged felines, a pair of columns, and a pair or two of memorial stelae. These felines, whom connoisseurs called "the most noble creatures to guard any tomb in Asia" came in two varieties. The qilin, distinguished by their horns and beards, appeared at emperor's tombs, while the princes of blood (wang) had the bixie, who sported lions' manes and long outstretched tongues in their wide-opened mouths. While both fantastic species must have derived from the Han era animal statuary, experts distinguish the two's pedigrees. The stocky bixie is thought to have evolved from the tiger statues of Han-era tombs in Sichuan and Shandong; however, there is now more emphasis on the power of the creature than on its speed. It is not clear any more what the symbolism of the outstretched tongue was: it has been variously interpreted as a prayer for rain, or as a way of communicating with the world of gods. The more elegant and sinuous qilin, their bodies almost completely covered with complicated patterns of carved curves, have a touch of Chinese dragon in them, and may have been related to the Han tomb statues from central China (e.g. the pair from Cuanlinmiao in Luoyang).

Southern dynasties—qilin and bixie

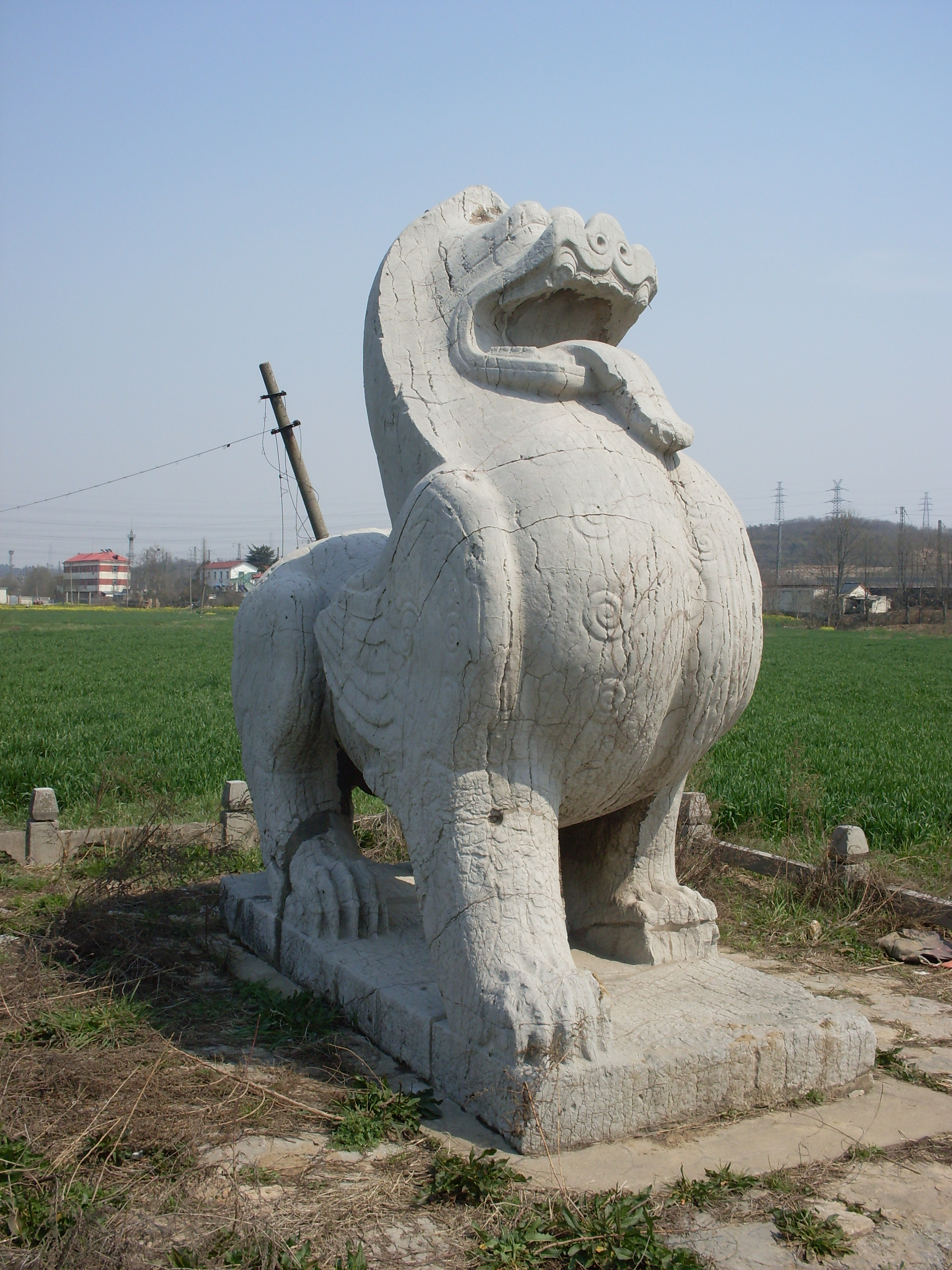
A bixie from the tomb of Xiao Jing (Liang dynasty)

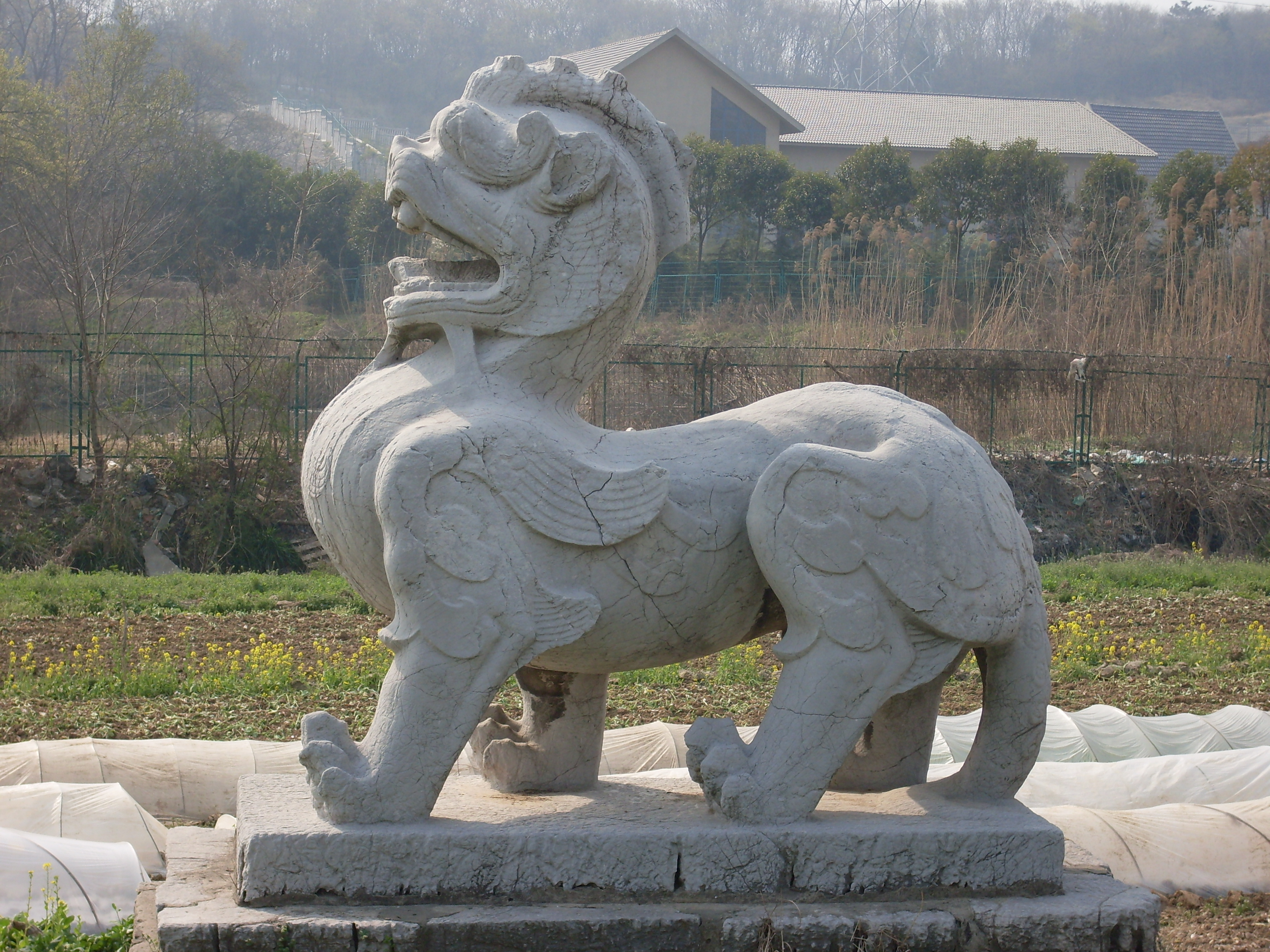
A qilin from the Yongning Tomb of the Emperor Wen of Chen

=== Ming dynasty ===
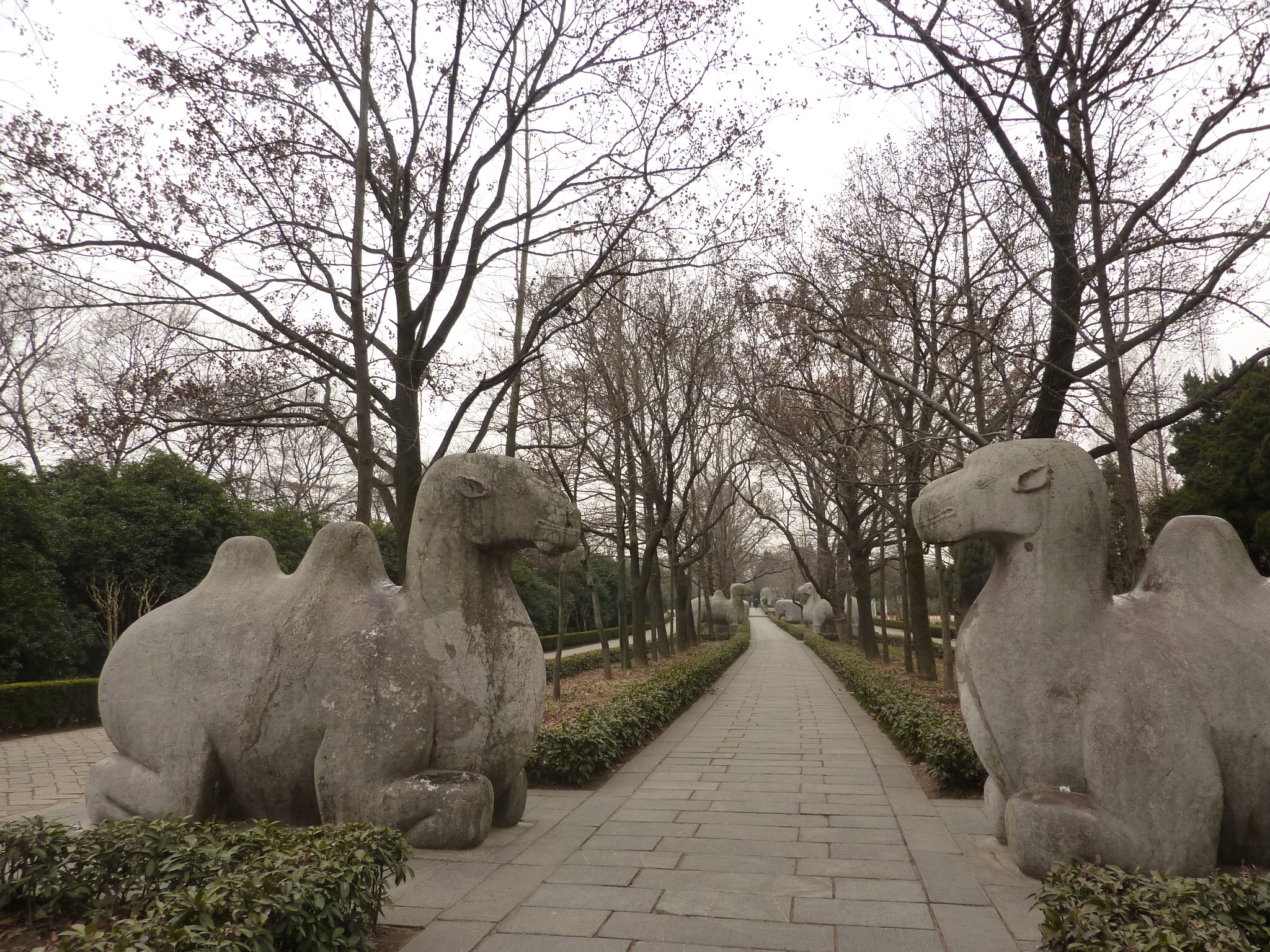
Camels along the sacred way at Ming Xiaoling, Nanjing

Later on, the layout of many mausolea involves a large stone tortoise (bixi) along with the sacred way. At Ming dynasty mausolea in Nanjing, e.g. the Ming Xiaoling or the tomb of the Sultan of Brunei Abdul Majid Hassan, visitors are first met by a bixi holding a stone tablets extolling the virtues of the deceased, and then walk along the sacred way to the tumulus where the emperor or dignitary is actually buried.

== Notable examples ==
Sacred ways are found in a number of imperial mausolea:

- Qianling Mausoleum near Xi'an
- Ming Zuling in Huai'an
- Ming Xiaoling in Nanjing
- Thirteen Ming Imperial Tombs near Beijing, with a common sacred way for all tombs
- Zhao Mausoleum of the early Qing emperors near Shenyang
- Eastern Qing Tombs near Beijing.

At the graves of other dignitaries:

- Tomb of the Sultan of Brunei Abdul Majid Hassan in Nanjing
- Multiple examples (primarily, tombs of the Dukes of Yansheng) in the Cemetery of Confucius, Qufu

== See also ==
- Corpse road in European cultures
