= Shendao columns =

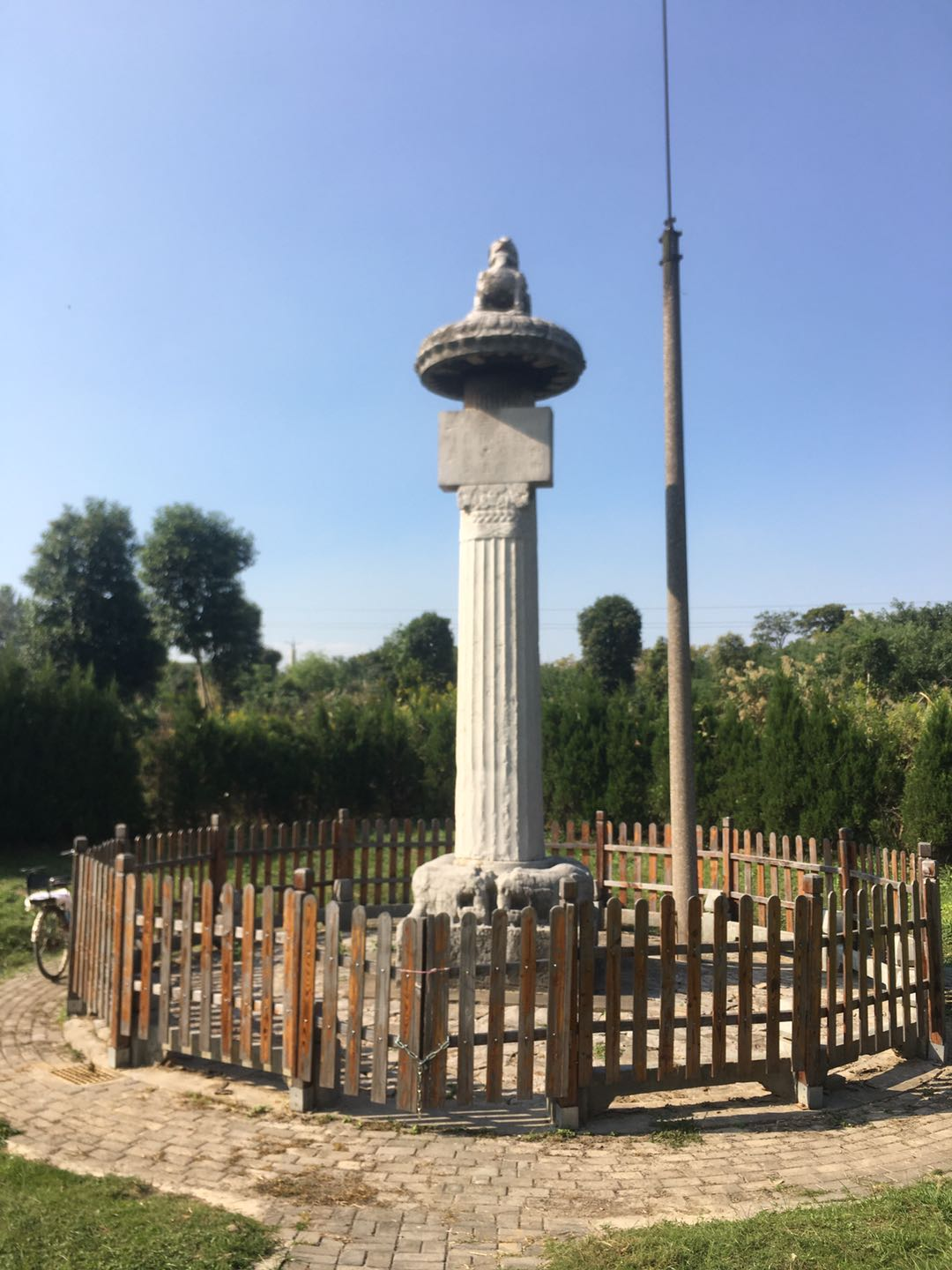
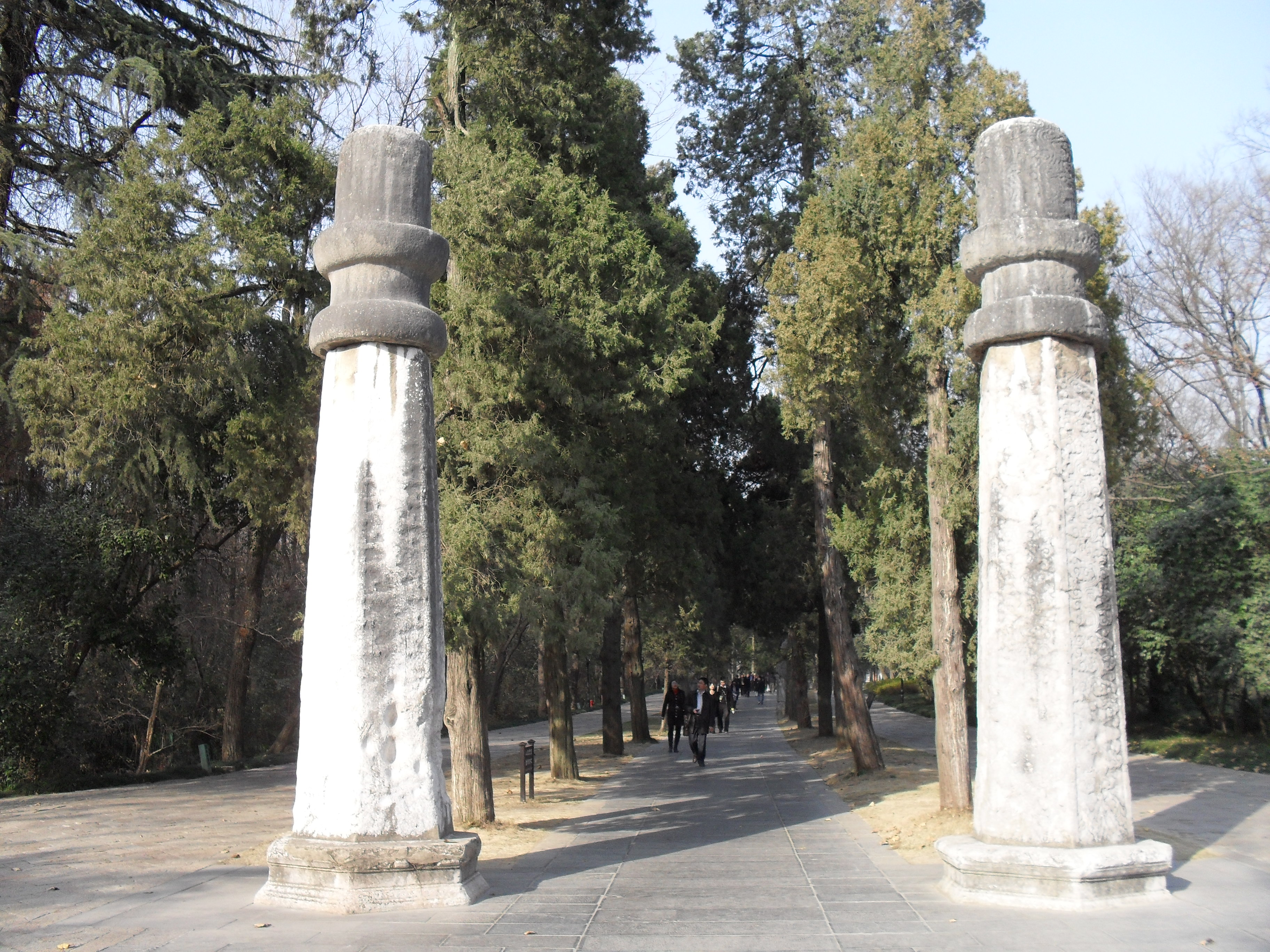
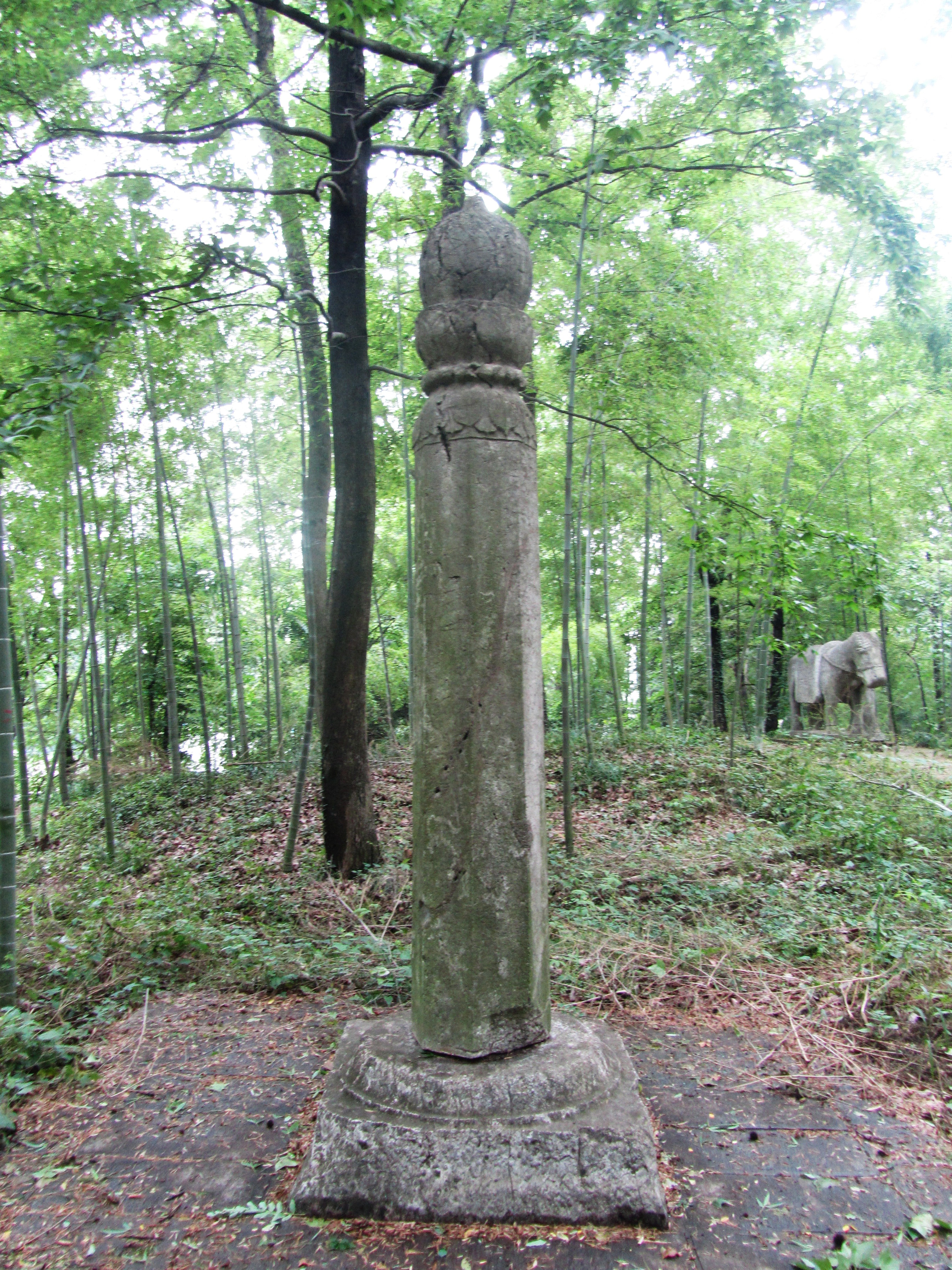
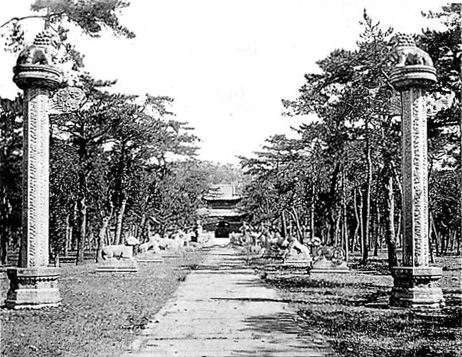
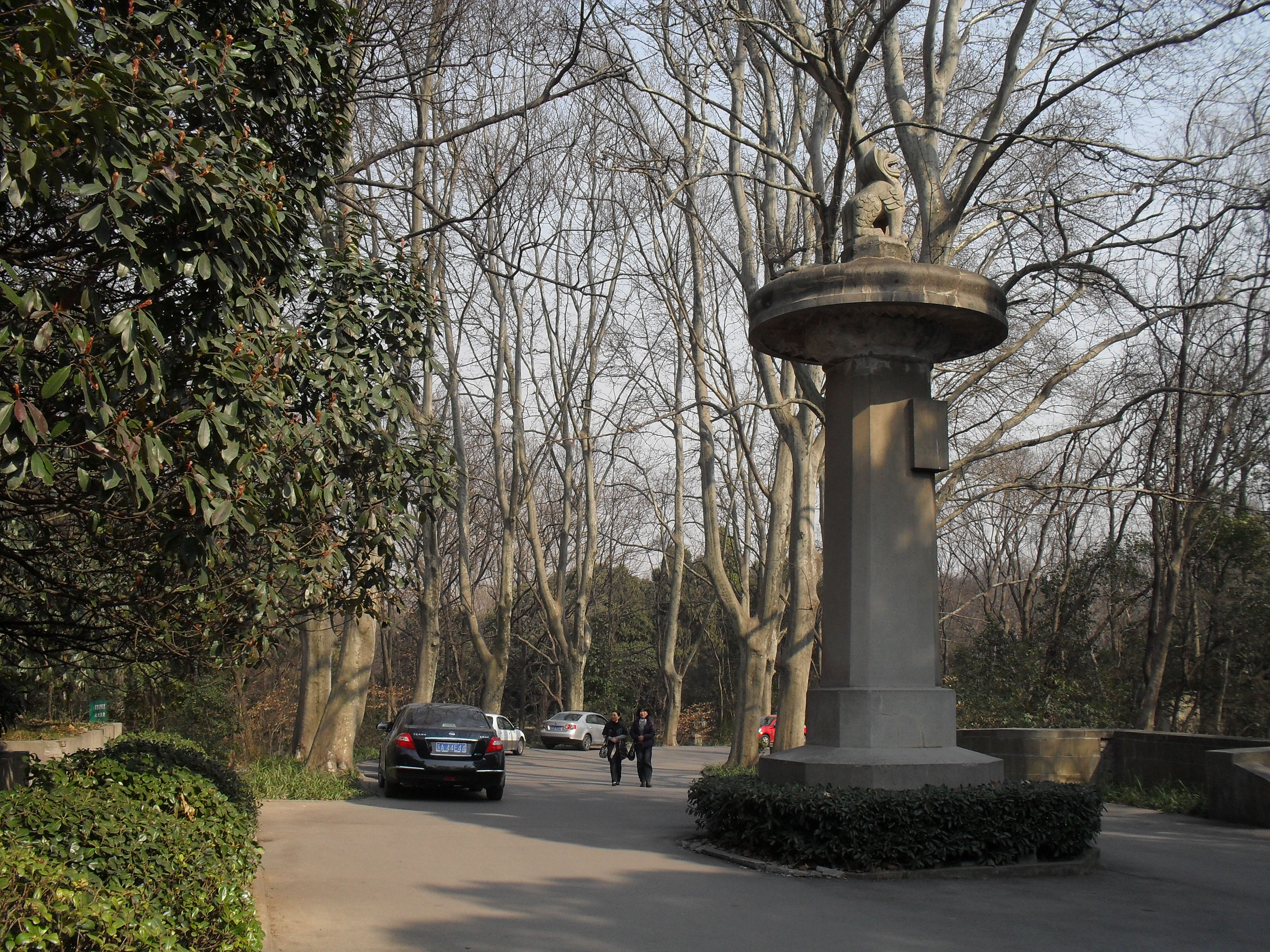
Shendao columns

Shendao columns (Chinese: 神道柱) are stone columnar sculptures erected alongside the sacred ways of Chinese tombs. They appeared from Eastern Han dynasty in China.

Some of them used Hellenistic decorations, such as Ionic order (瓦棱柱) and fasces (束竹柱).
