= Sultan Ahmad of Brunei =

Sultan of Brunei (r. 1408–1425)

Ahmad أحمد

Sultan of Brunei
- Reign: 1402–1425
- Predecessor: Abdul Majid Hassan
- Successor: Sharif Ali
- Born: Awang Pateh Berbai; 1338
- Died: c. 1425 (aged 87)
- Spouse: Putri Kinabatangan
- Issue: Puteri Ratna Kesuma
- Father: Dewa Amas Kayangan
- Religion: Sunni Islam

Ahmad (born 1338 - c. 1425), also known as Pateh Berbai, was the third sultan of Brunei from 1408 until his death in 1425. He was the eldest son of Dewa Amas Kayangan and the brother of Awang Alak Betatar (also known as Muhammad Shah of Brunei). It was under him that the kingdom adopted the name Brunei, this ascribed him as the founder of Brunei in the Syair Awang Semaun (Poem of Awang Semaun). Islamic education is thought to have begun in the country during the rule of his predecessor and continued under him.

== Background ==
Among the 14 siblings born to their father, Dewa Emas Kayangan, and a Murut woman from Limbang were Awang Alak Betatar, Awang Pateh Berbai, and Awang Semaun. Dewa Emas Kayangan, in order to satisfy his pregnant wife, set off on a mission to find a certain kind of cattle known as the tembadau. He fathered offspring and married women in four villages along the way, eventually producing the 14 siblings listed. Dewa Emas Kayangan made the decision to ascend to the celestial regions after discovering the tembadau; there, he was referred to as Batara Kala di Kayangan.

== Early life ==
Prior to his reign, he was called Awang Pateh Berbai or Pateh Berbai in short. According to the Syair Awang Semaun, this first community was founded because 14 siblings wanted to start and construct a new village. Pateh Berbai led the Sakai tribe's retinue to the Brunei River, where they searched for a suitable spot for a colony. They discovered a site that was strategically located, nestled between hills, and had access to water from a neighbouring river. He later became the first Pengiran Bendahara in Brunei. Tugan, the chief of the Retus and the leader of the Igan people in Melanau, tried to overthrow Awang Alak Betatar's authority with the help of his in-law Besiong. The soldiers of Awang Alak Betatar, led by Pateh Berbai, overcame them.

The history of Brunei is explained in the Syair Awang Semaun, which was written during the reign of Awang Alak Betatar and his siblings. Awang Semaun at Kota Batu; Pateh Mambang and Pateh Tuba at Luba; Pateh Sangkuna and Pateh Manggurun at Saba; Pateh Malakai at Bukit Panggal; Pateh Pahit at Labuhan Kapal; Damang (Damong) Sari at Bukit Salilah; Pateh Sindayung at Panchor Papan, Demang Lebar Daun, Hapu Awang, Pateh Berbai; and Pateh Laila Langgong are among the characters in the poem.

== Reign ==
Pateh Berbai ascended the throne following the death of his nephew, Sultan Abdul Majid Hassan in 1408. However the Sisilah Sultan-Sultan Brunei mentioned his predecessor as his father-in-law, Sultan Muhammad Shah. Adding to the confusion, another source (Batu Bersilah) claimed that Sultan Ahmad was the brother of the mentioned Sultan. Moreover, Brunei historians have created a genealogy outlining the history of the Brunei royal family, beginning with the first Sultan, who was the country's first sultan. But in doing so, they controversially changed Sultan Ahmad's place in the lineage.

=== Relations with China ===
Under the leadership of the Muslim eunuch Zheng He, Ming China displayed its maritime might during the first three decades of the fifteenth century by sending ships through the South China Sea, the Strait of Malacca, the Indian Ocean, the Persian Gulf, and all the way to the eastern shores of Africa. Although it is unknown if the fleet ever visited Brunei, the politically adept Sultan Ahmad went on a tribute mission to the Ming court. In 1408, he presented his loyalty to Emperor Yongle by giving a tribute in person, making him the first southern ruler to do such acts. The act would be well received by the Emperor.

=== Death ===
Sultan Ahmad died in 1425, thus he was succeeded by his son-in-law, Sultan Sharif Ali.

== Personal life ==
Sultan Ahmad married Puteri Kinabatangan. They had a daughter, Puteri Ratna Kesuma, who would later become the consort of Sultan Sharif Ali.

== Namesakes ==
- Jambatan Patih Berbai, a pedestrian bridge in Kampong Ayer.
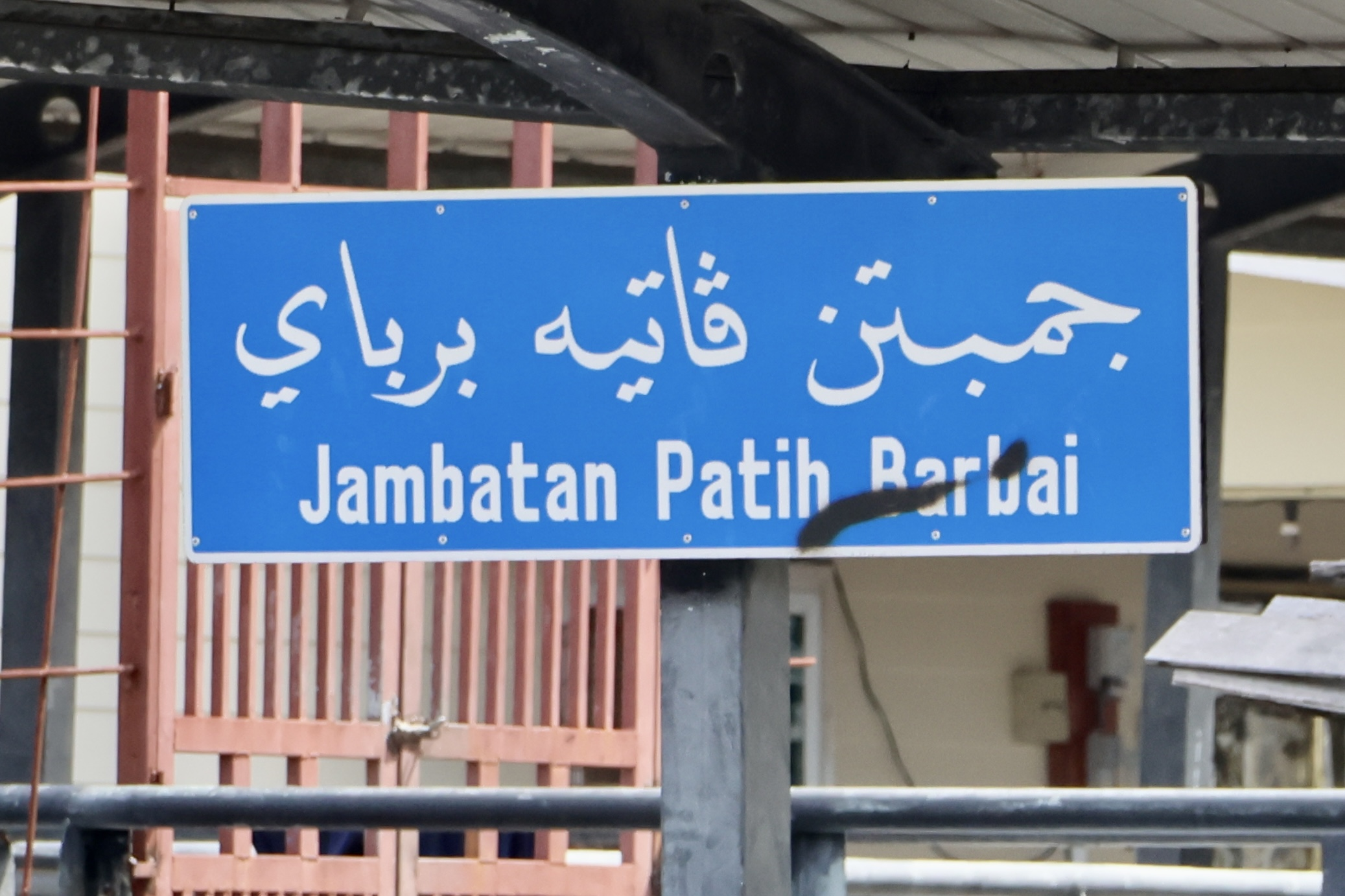
  Jambatan Patih Berbai

Regnal titles
Preceded by Abdul Majid Hassan	Sultan of Brunei; 1408–1425	Succeeded by Sharif Ali
