= Tomb of the King of Boni =

Tomb of Abdul Majid Hassan, in Nanjing, China

- 浡泥国王墓
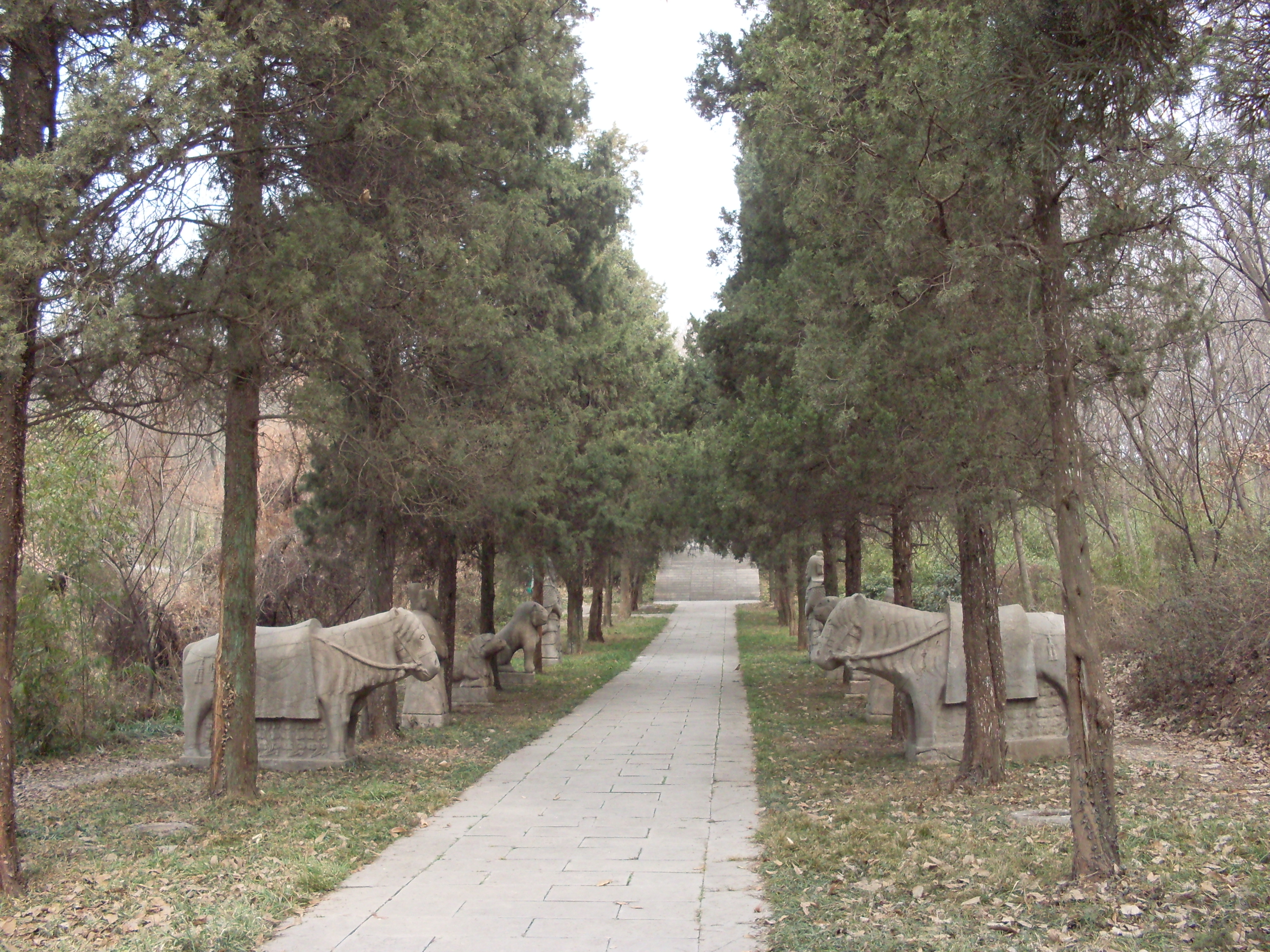
- The spirit way of the Tomb of the King of Boni
- Interactive map of the Tomb of the King of Boni area

General information
- Type: Tomb, spirit way statuary and stelae
- Location: No.9, Weijiu Road of Huacun, southern foot of Mountain Tortoise, Yuhuatai District, Nanjing, Jiangsu province, China
- Coordinates: 31.981722°N 118.760498°E
- Completed: 15th century

Tomb of the King of Boni
- Simplified Chinese: 浡泥国王墓
Transcriptions
Standard Mandarin
- Hanyu Pinyin: Bóní guówáng mù

The Tomb of the King of Boni is the tomb of Abdul Majid Hassan (also known as Maharaja Karna, or Ma Na Re Jia Na 麻那惹加那 in Chinese), the ruler of Boni, a medieval state on the island of Borneo sometimes considered to be the predecessor of modern Brunei. It and its associated statuary are located in a park at the southern foothills of Tortoise Mountain (Guishan), about 3 km south of the southern gate of the walled city of Nanjing.

The tomb was completed in the early 15th century during the Ming Dynasty, under the reign of the Yongle Emperor. It is one of the only two foreign rulers' tombs in China (the other one being the Tomb of the King of Sulu in Dezhou, Shandong). It is an important heritage site under state protection.

== History ==
The country whose name is recorded in the early Ming dynasty records as Bóní (渤泥) was a state on Borneo Island. By the time of their king's arrival to Nanjing, "Boni" had had a long history of contact with China, having sent envoys during the Northern Song dynasty.

In the third year of the Hongwu reign, Ming dynasty (1370), the emperor Zhu Yuanzhang dispatched imperial censor Zhang Jingzhi and Fujian official Shen Zhi to Boni on a diplomatic mission. On their return to China, the King of Boni sent his envoys along with the two Chinese officials.

Maharaja Karna ascended to the throne in 1402, and sent his envoys to China to pay tribute to the Yongle Emperor in 1405. In return, the Emperor granted an imperial mandate and seal to the King. The King was greatly pleased and decided to express his heartfelt thanks in person. Thus he arrived in Fujian province by sea, along with his wife, sons and several other relatives, and they received a warm welcome from the local officials sent by the central government.

== Death of Karna ==
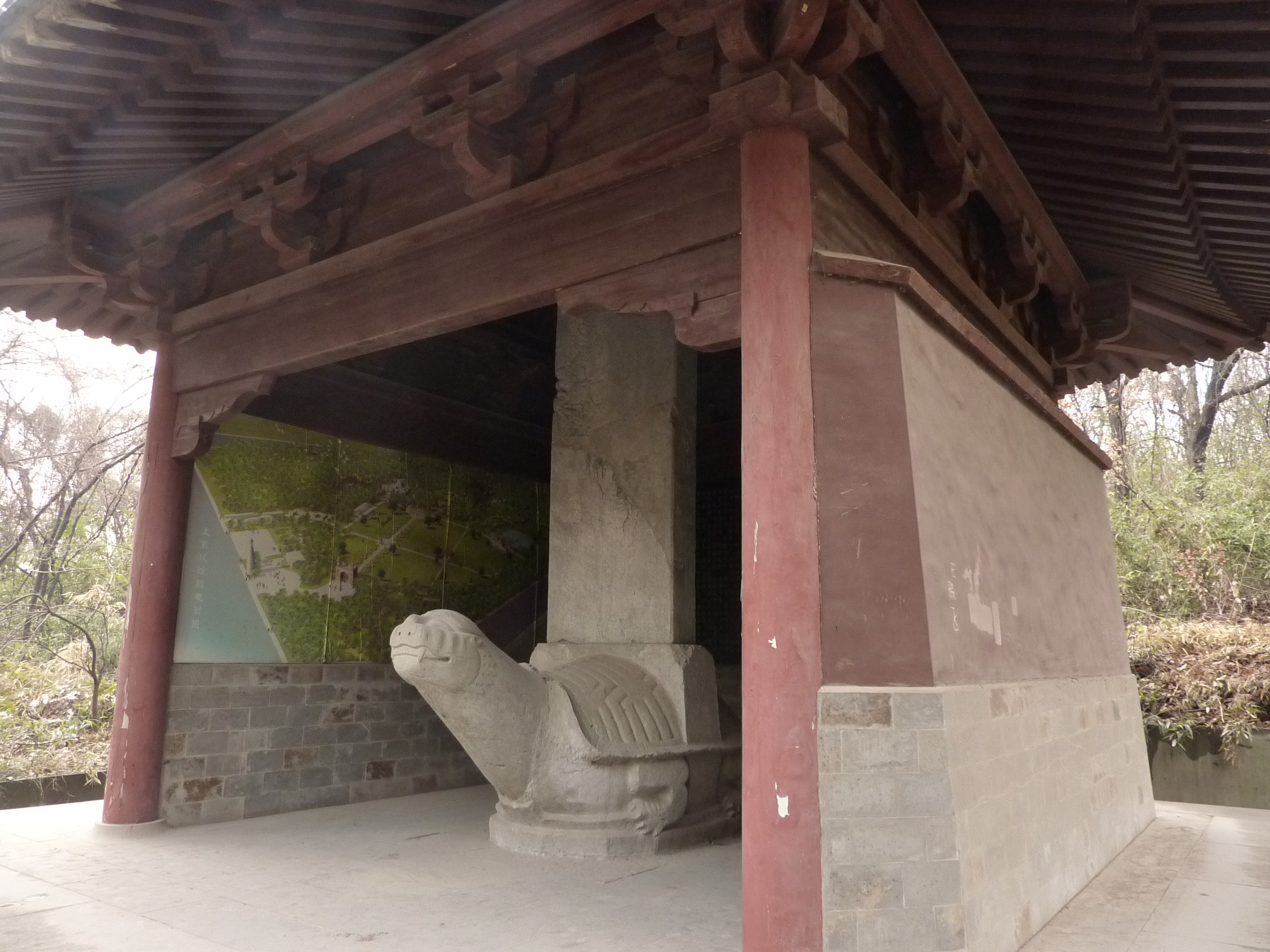
Pavilion with a tortoise-held stele in memory of the King of Boni

In August 1408, Maharaja Karna and his companions reached the Ming Empire's capital Nanjing, to attend the imperial court. He fell ill after staying in Nanjing for over a month. He was 28 years old when he died in his residence in the tenth lunar month of that year. In his testament, he showed a desire to "be buried in China". The Yongle Emperor suspended court for three days, dispatched officials to mourn for the King, and conferred the posthumous title of "Deferent" on him. After the Boni ruler's death, he was buried outside Andemen in Shizigang, which was in the southern part of Nanjing, according to the traditional burial customs of Chinese vassal. In addition, the Yongle Emperor ordered the king's son to succeed to his father's crown.

== Abandonment and rediscovery ==
Later, the tomb was deserted and abandoned in the forest, thus gained a name of "Huihuifen" (literally the tomb of the Hui people) from the local residents. During an archaeological survey in 1958, two broken fallen steles were rediscovered. According to the remaining inscriptions, the Boni king was inferred to be buried in the tomb. Afterwards, the Nanjing government carried out a series of renovations to the tomb, the gravestone, the spirit way, and rebuilt the memorial archway, the spirit pavilion and the stone platform. In 1982, the Tomb of the King of Boni was listed as the important protection unit of cultural relic of Jiangsu province and it became a Key Cultural Relic Unit under State Protection in 2001. The sister of the Brunei Sultan Hassanal Bolkiah, known as Princess Masna, visited the tomb of the King and attended the opening ceremony of the newly built "China-Brunei Friendship Hall" in 2006. On 23 October 2008, the Brunei Style Park was completed. It cost ¥23 million and Princess Masna again attended the opening ceremony.

== Architecture ==
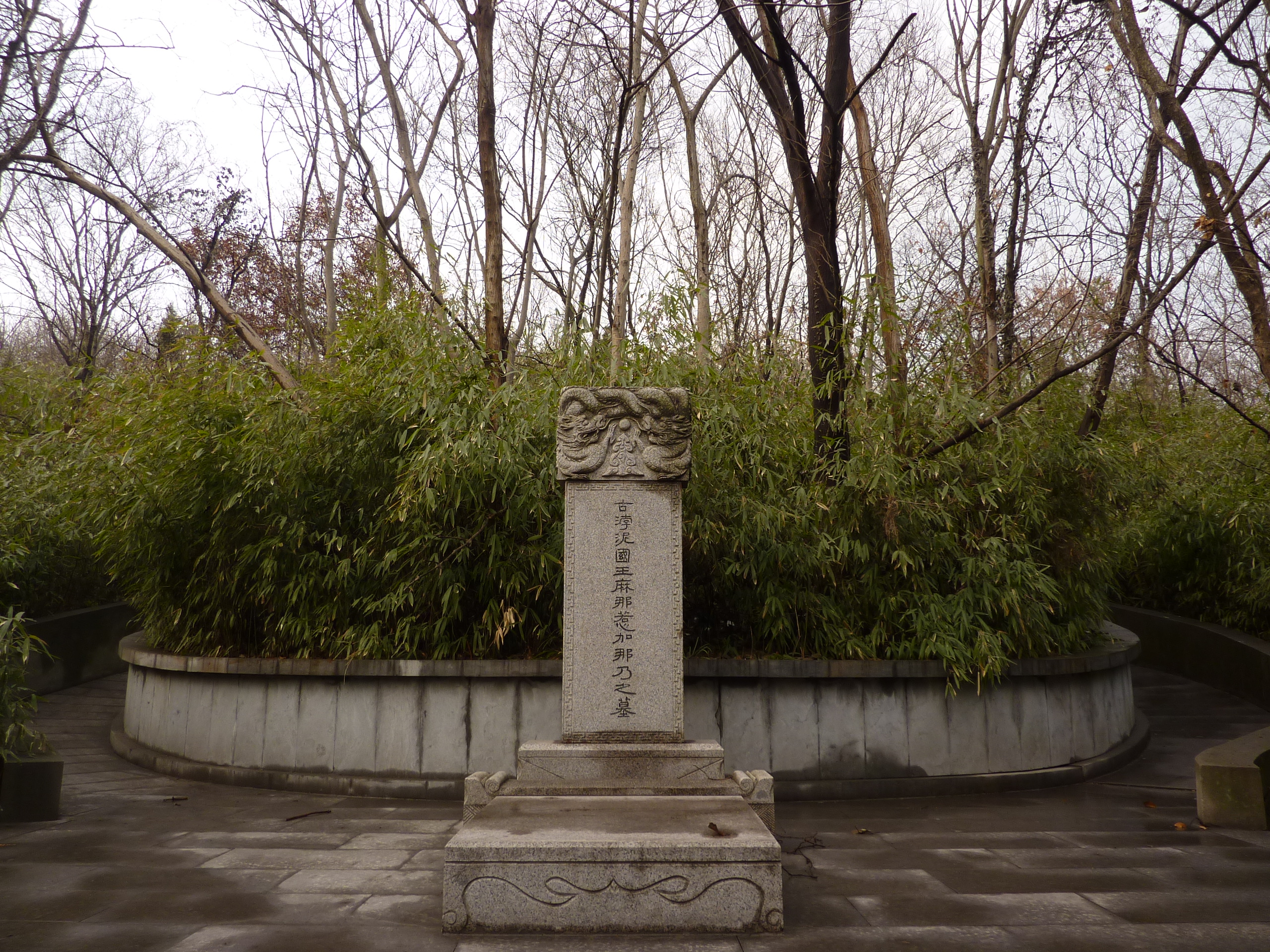
The tablet in front of the King's grave

The Tomb of the King of Boni faces northwards, with Niushou Mountain in the distance. There is a pool in front of it, and the tomb is surrounded by trees. Stone sculptures of generals, tigers, goats, horses and grooms are on either side of the spirit way, with very exotic touches in the carving. The tomb is at the end of the path, similar to that of Sulu King. It consists of a round, central mound and is surrounded with granite. The tombstone reads, "The Tombstone of the Deferent King of Boni". The inscription records the King's deeds, the treatment he received from the imperial court and the construction information of the tomb. It was written by Grand Secretary Hu Guang and engraved by Eunuch Zhang Qian with local selected stones. As the Boni people believed in Islam, the style of the King's tomb was quite different from that in the Central Plains.

== Current status ==
At present, the tomb and its surroundings are classed as "The Tomb of the King of Boni scenic spot", covering an area of 17 hectares. It is an AA category national tourist site which consists of three parts, namely the tomb of the King of Boni area, the Brunei Style Park and a service area. The shrine, the stone portraits and the tombs are still fairly well preserved. The ruins of the gravestone have been put up again, but most of the inscription has eroded over a long period of time. The Brunei Style Park contains the China-Brunei Friendship Hall, a mosque, the Brunei Water Garden, pavilions, side streets, labyrinths and Songfeng Palace, etc. The China-Brunei Friendship Hall contains a permanent exhibit of images and text regarding the interaction history of the two countries.

== See also ==
- Abdul Majid Hassan
- History of Brunei
- Spirit way
