= Bolkiah =

Sultan of Brunei (r. 1485–1524)

Bolkiah بلقية
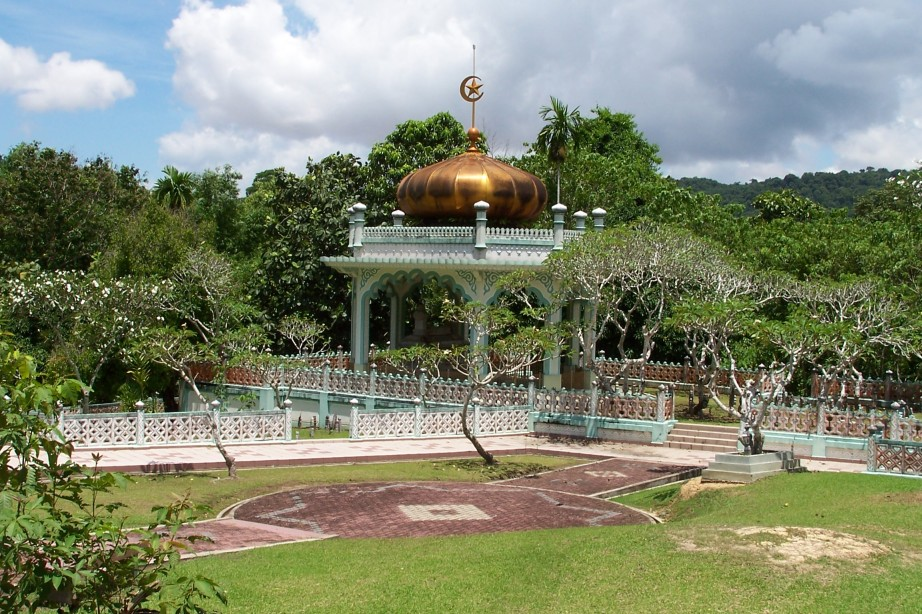
- The tomb of Sultan Bolkiah near Kota Batu

Sultan of Brunei
- Reign: 1485–1524
- Coronation: 1485
- Predecessor: Sulaiman
- Successor: Abdul Kahar
- Died: 17 July 1524; Kota Batu, Brunei
- Burial: Mausoleum of Sultan Bolkiah, Kota Batu, Brunei
- Spouse: Puteri Laila Menchanai
- Issue: Sultan Abdul Kahar
- House: Bolkiah
- Father: Sultan Sulaiman
- Religion: Sunni Islam

Bolkiah ibni Sulaiman (Jawi: بلقية ابن سليمان; died 17 July 1524) or commonly known as Nakhoda Ragam (Jawi: ناخودا راڬم), was the sixth sultan of Brunei from 1485 until his death in 1524, he ascended the throne upon the abdication of his father, Sultan Sulaiman. His reign was known as the "Golden Age of Brunei" due to its dominance throughout Borneo and the southern Philippines.

He is considered the first sultan to have used cannons, as the Sultan paid forty Javanese blacksmiths to teach metal casting in Brunei, possibly introducing cannon casting, introducing cannon technology to Brunei.

Bolkiah was mentioned in the Batu Tarsilah, a 19th-century Bruneian stone tablet which describes the genealogy of the Sultans of Brunei. He was also mentioned in the Silsilah Raja-Raja Berunai, a 19th-century manuscript which also describes the same genealogy. The Spaniards refer to him as Sultan Salan in the Boxer Codex, a 16th-century Spanish manuscript.

== Title ==
Bolkiah was known in Bornean and Malay traditions by the title Malay: Nakhoda Ragam, lit. 'Singing Captain'. However, it is argued that the title is also given to another Sultan of Brunei and other figures in the Malay Archipelago. Among other instruments, he was known to like playing the lute and drums. Known more for his unwavering diplomacy and opposition to violence, he was an adventurous navigator who frequently traveled to examine his territory and a figure who inspired numerous stories.

== Reign ==
=== Succession ===
The reign of Sultan Bolkiah is said to be the golden age of Brunei. His dominion is said to have included present-day Sarawak and Sabah in Borneo, as well as Manila and the Sulu Archipelago in the Philippines. There is also the possibility that his sovereignty also extended to Kalimantan, including Sambas, Kotaringin, Pontianak, Banjar, Barau and Bolongan. He was mentioned in Silsilah Raja-Raja Berunai as the Bruneian sultan who "defeated the states of Suluk and Seludang". (Note: "... Paduka Seri Sultan Bulkia iaitu raja yang mengalahkan negeri Suluk dan negeri Seludang...")

The early history of the Sultanate of Brunei, including the early years of its foundation and the Bruneian sultans who established the country, is the subject of study. The first Sultan of Brunei, Awang Alak Betatar, and his brothers, Awang Semaun, were among them. Ong Sum Ping, and Sultan Bolkiah are a few tales that center on the early history of the Brunei Sultanate, aside from that.

=== Antonio Pigafetta's visit to Brunei ===
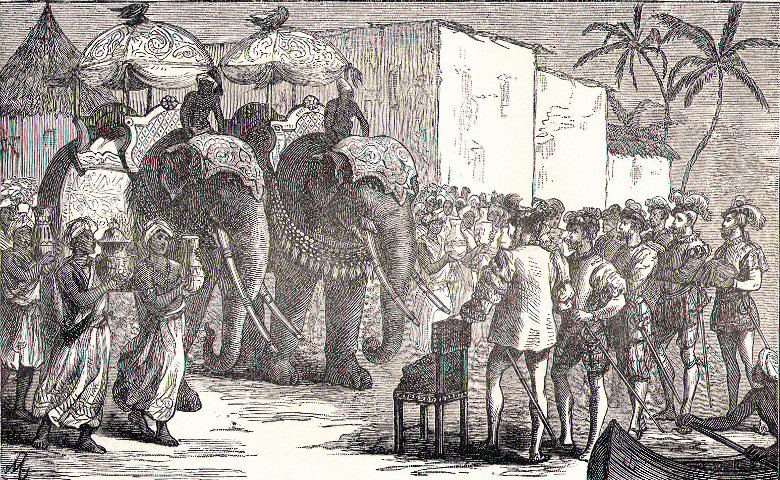
Magellan's delegation being welcomed to Borneo in 1521

Early 16th century Portuguese accounts shed light on Brunei's economic links. One such report, from Tomé Pires in 1515, cites Brunei's merchant ships arriving at Malacca with those from Tanjungpura and Labai in West Kalimantan. This demonstrates the importance of Borneo's trading powers at the time, with Brunei and Java depending on Labai (Laoe)'s advantageous location at the mouth of the Kapuas River. By recording Brunei's reconquest of Labai and providing firsthand accounts from his contact with Ferdinand Magellan's expedition, Antonio Pigafetta's 1521 visit and report emphasises Brunei's great influence. It also shows Brunei's reach over Borneo and the Philippine islands.

Arriving at a harbour on Borneo's northwest coast, Magellan's alguacil, Gonzalo de Espinosa recognised it as Bruni (the capital of Brunei). The Spaniards safely moored close to the coast, receiving a warm welcome from the villagers, who were used to seeing European ships. Even though they kept a close eye on things, the night was uneventful and there were no conflicts, so the crew and officers slept well. Early in the morning, Espinosa welcomed the leaders of Bruni aboard his flagship, the Trinidad, where they arrived in a grand, gilded barge accompanied by musicians. They brought gifts including livestock, fruits, betel-filled containers, and arrack, initiating diplomatic exchanges characterized by mutual respect and cultural exchange.

Following their journey to the flagship Trinidad and the Victoria with comparable offerings, the chiefs' friendly welcome encouraged Bolkiah to dispatch three further barges, each carrying a group of chiefs and musicians. As the musicians performed loudly from these barges around the Spanish ships, Espinosa gave the order to salute and raised flags in recognition. The rice, honey, and egg cakes that the Bornean ruler gifted the Spaniards were quickly consumed. Bolkiah replied shortly afterward, allowing the Spaniards to freely trade with his people and purchase goods on shore. Then, Espinosa sent seven of his more experienced men – among them Pigafetta – to the town to see the monarch. A Turkish cloak, velvet seats, linen, a glass, a vase, and a gold pen and ink box were among the presents they brought for Bolkiah. Additional gifts were made for the queen consort and the Sultan's courtiers.

Bolkiah was surrounded by plenty of women of different skin tones. When the guests arrived at the palace, they were astounded by its wealth. A vast hall accessible via wide steps was crowded with courtiers wearing elegant clothing. Past this hallway was a slightly raised chamber adorned with lavish silk and brocade drapes, bathed in natural light from expansive windows. Three hundred of the king's warriors with daggers drawn, were stationed there to guard. A little farther in was a smaller but no less well decorated room where the muscular forty-year-old monarch, smoked betel on a big cushion with one of his young sons by his side.

As soon as they entered the palace's first hall, the guests were given pillows from which to see the monarch up close. They were told that they could not speak to Bolkiah directly and that they would have to pass their messages via a chain of authorities – speaking to a selected chief first, who would relay the information to another official, who would relay it to a higher official, and lastly to the first minister, who would be standing next to the king and present it to the monarch. They were taught the appropriate standing etiquette, which included standing up, joining their hands over their heads, lifting each foot alternately, bending down three times to bow respectfully to the monarch, and kissing their hands.

Upon awakening, Espinosa discovered a group of perhaps one hundred indigenous junks in the harbour, arranged into three squadrons and manned by strong Borneo fighters. Espinosa soon came to the conclusion that resistance would be ineffective and gave the order for his ships to hoist anchor and set sail, thinking the king was trying to catch him off guard. Furious by what he saw as the Sultan's betrayal, Espinosa ordered cannon fire on a number of neighbouring junks, causing two of them to sink, two more to ground, and killing several people within. Espinosa quickly came to regret firing at the junks once a smaller boat approached the flagship with a peace flag flying. A leader clarified that the fleet was returning from a military mission to Luzon, where they had fought; they had no intention of assaulting the Spaniards. Espinosa promptly made apologies by going back to the harbour after realising his error. The Spaniards' connection with the natives improved when the monarch accepted his presents and apologies.

=== Insights from Pigafetta's reports ===
"On the morning of Monday, 29 July 1521, we saw more than a hundred boats divided into three groups of warships... one of the groups was led by the prince of Luzon, who had become the captain general of the king of Brunei," Pigafetta wrote in his report on the attack on the Labai government. He had recently returned from a visit to the sizable city known as Laoe, which is situated at the tip of Borneo and faces Pulau Java (Java Island). That nation was overthrown and taken over because it had given Java sovereignty.

The attack was successful in regaining control of the state of Labai for Brunei. Although the oral tradition does not include the Kingdom of Labai or the kingdoms along the Kapuas River, Pigafetta's account confirms Bruneian oral tradition about the size of the Brunei Empire during Bolkiah's reign. By revealing that Brunei once ruled over areas in western Borneo alongside territories in the northwest and east (Sarawak and Sabah) and the Philippine Islands, Pigafetta's tale adds to the oral history. In addition, there have been reports of a kota (city) in Brunei Bay (Junjungan) that is home to kafir, or non-Muslims: "In the same port is another city inhabited by heathens, which is larger than that of the Moros (Brunei), and built like the latter in salt water. On that account the two peoples have daily contacts together in the same harbour. The heathens king is as powerful as the Moro king..."

The Bisaya people who reside next to Brunei are referred to as living in the kota kafir (non-Muslim city). It appears that the King of Bisaya (Raja Bisaya) still had the power to pose a threat to Brunei, who shared the same port, at the start of the 16th century. The oral history of Raja Lumbi (Raja Bisaya), who dominated the area surrounding Brunei Bay, is corroborated by Pigafetta's narrative. In 1526, Portuguese traders from Malacca visited Brunei and saw its affluence, which led them to conclude that the country was a powerful and large empire. It stated in Jorge de Menezes' 1526 assessment on Brunei's strength that: "... the people of Brunei ... are a brave people because they used to sail to Malacca, Pegu (Burma) and other places with merchandise, and Brunei is a strong kingdom."

=== Expansion, conquest, and influence ===
Events relating to the growth of the Brunei Empire were first recorded by Western sources in the 16th century. Oral tradition is confirmed by these Western records, which include tales like that of Nakhoda Ragam, who is credited with becoming Sultan Bolkiah, who is known for extending Brunei's power throughout Borneo.

Every Salasilah Raja-Raja Brunei, 'Royal Genealogy of Brunei' mentions Sultan Bolkiah, as a valiant leader who overthrew the Sultanate of Sulu and Seludang. The genealogy of Datu Imam Ya'akub and Khatif Haji Abdul Latif stated that Bolkiah overthrew the realms of Datu Kemin's Sulu and Seludang. Despite this, the genealogy translation by Pehin Orang Kaya Digadong states that the Sultan battled with the Suluk people and destroyed Datu Kemin's Suluk and Seluang. The Sultan married Puteri Lela Manjani (Lela Menchanai), a princess from Sulu, and went by the name Nahoda Ragam (Nakhoda Ragam). One tradition states that Bolkiah married a Javanese princess. It is also said that her followers intermarried with the Bruneian people, which became the ancestors for the Kedayan ethnic group.

Bolkiah's victory over Seludang as well as his marriage to Puteri Laila Menchanai, the daughter of Sulu Sultan Amir Ul-Ombra, widened Brunei's influence in the region. This increased Brunei's wealth as well as extending Islamic teachings in the region, resulting in the influence and power of Brunei reaching its peak during this period. His rule reached essentially all of coastal Borneo, as far south as Banjarmasin, and as far north as the island of Luzon, including the Philippines.

Following their conquest of the Borneo kingdoms on the northwest coast, Awang Semaun, Awang Jerambak, and Demang Seri proceeded to extend Brunei's borders to include the Ilanun and Bugis-ruled northern and northeastern states of Borneo as well as the Datu-ruled states of Sulu and Seludang. Brunei has effectively taken control of the states of Makassar, Bulungan, Sadungan, Sulu, Kinabatangan, and Seludang, according to Syair Awang Semaun, 'Poem of Awang Semaun'. As the story of Bolkiah is also told in the poem, it is possible that the expansion of the Brunei Empire under the leadership of Awang Alak Betatar is included. This is due to Awang Asmara – the son of Awang Senuai – helping Bolkiah by bringing him to Selangor so he could marry Princess Lela Mencanai. The uncertainty over the chronology of Brunei's territorial expansion is shown in the inclusion of Sultan Bolkiah's account in the poem.

=== Marriages and legends ===
The Salasilah Raja-Raja Brunei of Pengiran Sabtu Kamaluddin also includes a lengthy account of Bolkiah's life. The roles that Datu Bangkaya and Datu Sumacuel played were comparable to those of Bolkiah, who brought a bushel of black pepper with him when he sailed around the island of Borneo and planted a pepper on every island he came across until he ran out. This demonstrates that the Bisaya people had a long-standing custom of sowing seeds or plants in recently conquered areas prior to the Sultan. It is said that the Sultan abducted his spouse Puteri Lela Menchanai while in Sultanate of Gowa. In Kinabatangan, the Sultan also married the daughter of a Chinese noble.

There is an oral narrative in Berau Regency, East Kalimantan, concerning a Bruneian nobleman named Langkuda Tarawih who married Puteri Kenik Berau Senifah, a princess of the Berau Sultanate who was discovered drifting in the water. The narrative of Bolkiah, though it does not include his name, is identical to the tale of the Sultan discovering Princess Lela Menchanai floating in the ocean. This story is also shared by the Bruneian community in the Kudat District of Sabah and describes a Sultan of Brunei marrying Princess Milau, whom he discovered in the waters of Northern Borneo during the Sultan's circumnavigation of Borneo.

The Iban people of Kampong Tembawang Sauh, Sarawak, have an oral tradition that tells the story of Ismail, a poor family's son, who paid off his debt to Raja Sambas's son with gold sand he found in the Sambas well. Raja Sambas then gave Ismail the title of Chief Ragam. The occurrence of Bolkiah in the Sarawakian Iban tradition indicates the extent of the story's effect on the native population of Borneo, which was formerly a colony of Brunei, even if the story differs from what is contained in the Salasilah Raja-Raja Brunei and other oral traditions.

=== Death and his mausoleum ===
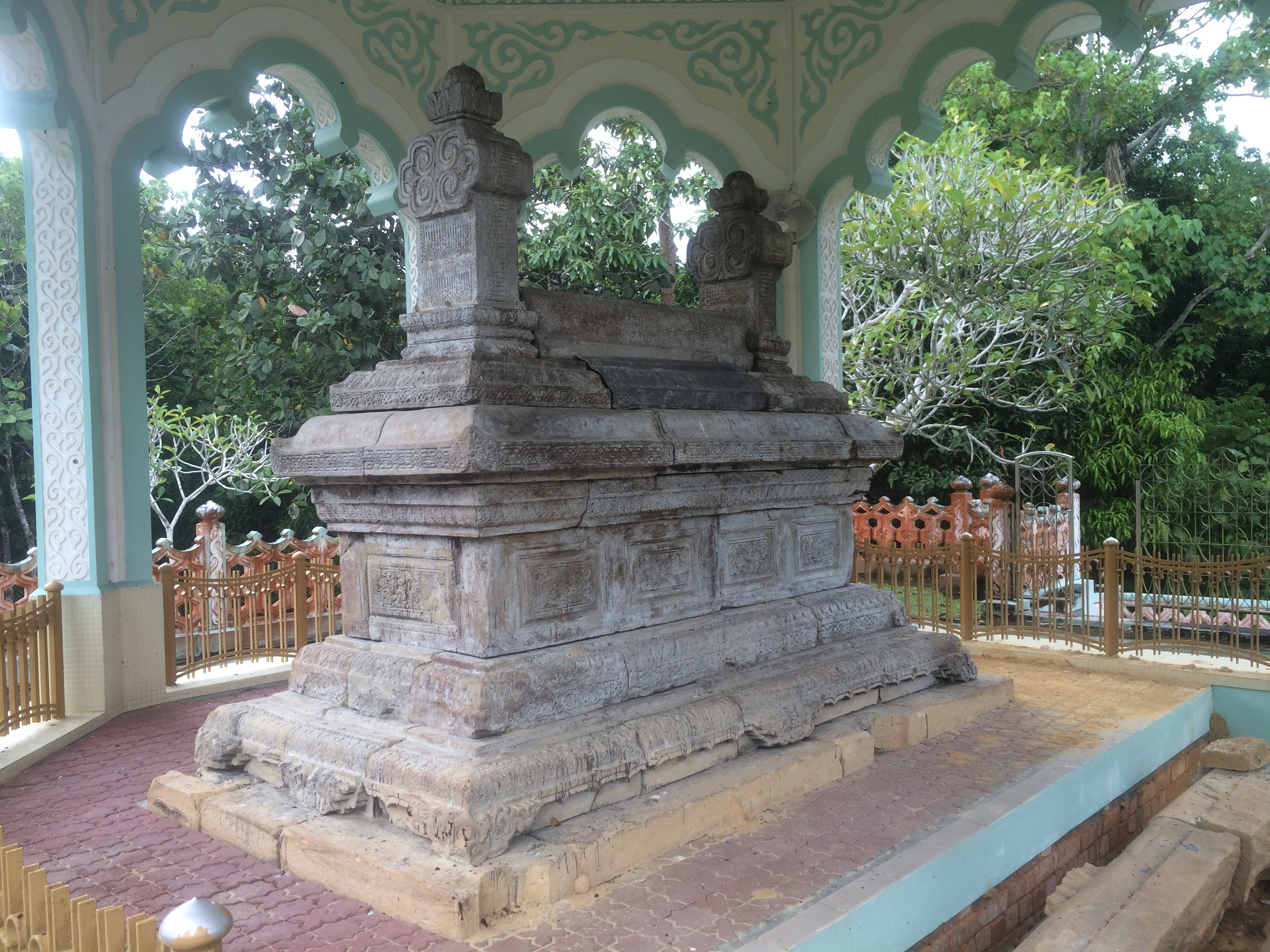
Tombstone of Bolkiah

After his death, he was succeeded by his son, Abdul Kahar. The mausoleum of Sultan Bolkiah, sits on ridgeline at Jalan Kota Batu, facing the Brunei River and is surrounded by dense vegetation. A light blue and white fence surrounds the tomb, symbolising his love for diplomacy and music.

Bolkiah's sandstone mausoleum has two tombstones at the summit of eight tiers of stone. Dimensions of the tomb: 156.7 cm (61.7 in) high, 355.5 cm (140.0 in) long, and 199.5 cm (78.5 in) wide. The top is decorated with carvings that shows the royal emblem encircled by Daun Selambar Basusun. The designs of Daun Setampik, Bunga Paip, Bunga Cangkih, and Lalau Paria extend forth on the gravestone. Engraved on its body are several flower themes, including Bunga Jambangan, Lalau Paria, and Bunga Sakuntum, in addition to Biji Mutiara and Pola Bulan Purnama sculptures. Daun Salambar Basusun and Lalau Paria are etched on the tombstone's bottom portions.

The tomb itself is unmarked, but two steles have been placed above it, one commemorating Sultan Muhammad Ali and the other Sultan Abdul Mubin. Between them rests a slab that records the death of Sultan Bolkiah bin Sulaiman on the ninth of Ramadan A.H. 930 (17 July 1524), with the date carefully spelled out in words. This entire structure is unrelated to the original tomb. The two steles, likely crafted by the same artist in the late 17th century, were added at an unknown time and for reasons that remain a mystery. The date slab, of noticeably simpler craftsmanship, offers no clues about when it was positioned there. It is possible that this slab was carved in more recent times to support Hugh Low's suggestion that Magellan's expedition visited during Bolkiah's later years, around 1521.

== Things named after him ==
- IBTE Sultan Bolkiah Campus is a campus of the post-secondary vocational Institute of Brunei Technical Education (IBTE) in Seria, Brunei.
- Kampong Bolkiah is a village and housing development located in Bandar Seri Begawan, near Kampong Ayer.
- Kampong Bolkiah Religious School serves as the village's principal Islamic religious education institution since 1999.
- Jalan Bolkiah is a road in Seria, Brunei.

== See also ==
- List of sultans of Brunei
- Hassanal Bolkiah

== Notes ==
Regnal titles
Preceded by Sulaiman	Sultan of Brunei; 1485–1524	Succeeded by Abdul Kahar
