= Abdul Majid Hassan =

Sultan of Brunei from 1402 to 1408

Abdul Majid Hassan عبدالمجيد حسن

Sultan of Brunei
- Reign: 1402–1408
- Predecessor: Muhammad Shah
- Successor: Ahmad
- Born: 1379/80
- Died: 19 October 1408 (aged 29–30); Huitong Pavilion, Nanjing, Ming dynasty
- Burial: Tomb of the King of Boni, Nanjing, China
- Father: Sultan Muhammad Shah
- Religion: Sunni Islam

Abdul Majid Hassan ibni Muhammad Shah (Jawi: عبدالمجيد حسن ابن محمد شاه), also known as Maharaja Karna (Chinese: 麻那惹加那), was the second sultan of Brunei from 1402 until his death in 1408, albeit allegedly. He became one of the only two foreign rulers to be buried in China. Despite not being mentioned in the Salasilah Raja-Raja Brunei, a discovery on Jalan Residency in Brunei mentioned the name Rokyah binti Sultan Abdul Majid Hassan ibnu Muhammad Shah Al-Sultan, indicating this person was a child of Sultan Abdul Majid Hassan.

== Reign ==
=== Succession ===
He may have ascended the Brunei throne in 1402, following the death of his father, Sultan Muhammad Shah. He dispatched envoys to China in 1405 to present homage to the Yongle Emperor. He received an imperial mandate and seal in exchange from the Emperor. He, who was ecstatic, made the decision to personally thank everyone. Additionally that same year, Admiral Zheng He visited Brunei.

To attend the imperial court, the Sultan Abdul Majid and his friends travelled to Nanjing, on 20 August 1408. Following the ascension of Emperor Zhu Di, this was the first foreign king to visit China. When he learned about it, he was elated. The Emperor requested a high-level reception for the Sultan from members of the court's Ministry of Rites in order to increase his power. The imperial court dispatched officials to meet and greet the Sultan together with his family, including his wife, sons, and other relatives when he arrived in Fujian Province via boat, and the central government's deputies along the road accorded one another with respect.

When the Sultan entered the court, he paid respect with gifts such as belts, tortoise shells, rhinoceros horns, gold and silver utensils, and other items. He also delivered an etching in gold to Emperor Zhu Di. The acts made by the Sultan impressed the Emperor. He even praised the Sultan, remarking that the heads of southern nations were not as wise as him. The gifts given by the Ministry of Rites of the imperial court to the Sultan include silver ceremonial guards, water tanks, water basins, umbrellas and fans, as well as gold weaving, as per the orders of Emperor Zhu Di. The princess and the Sultan's entourage were also showered with lavish presents. The Sultan enjoyed the guard of honour supplied by the palace and the priceless everyday requirements used by the court while residing in China in the Huitong Pavilion for foreign visitors.

=== Death ===
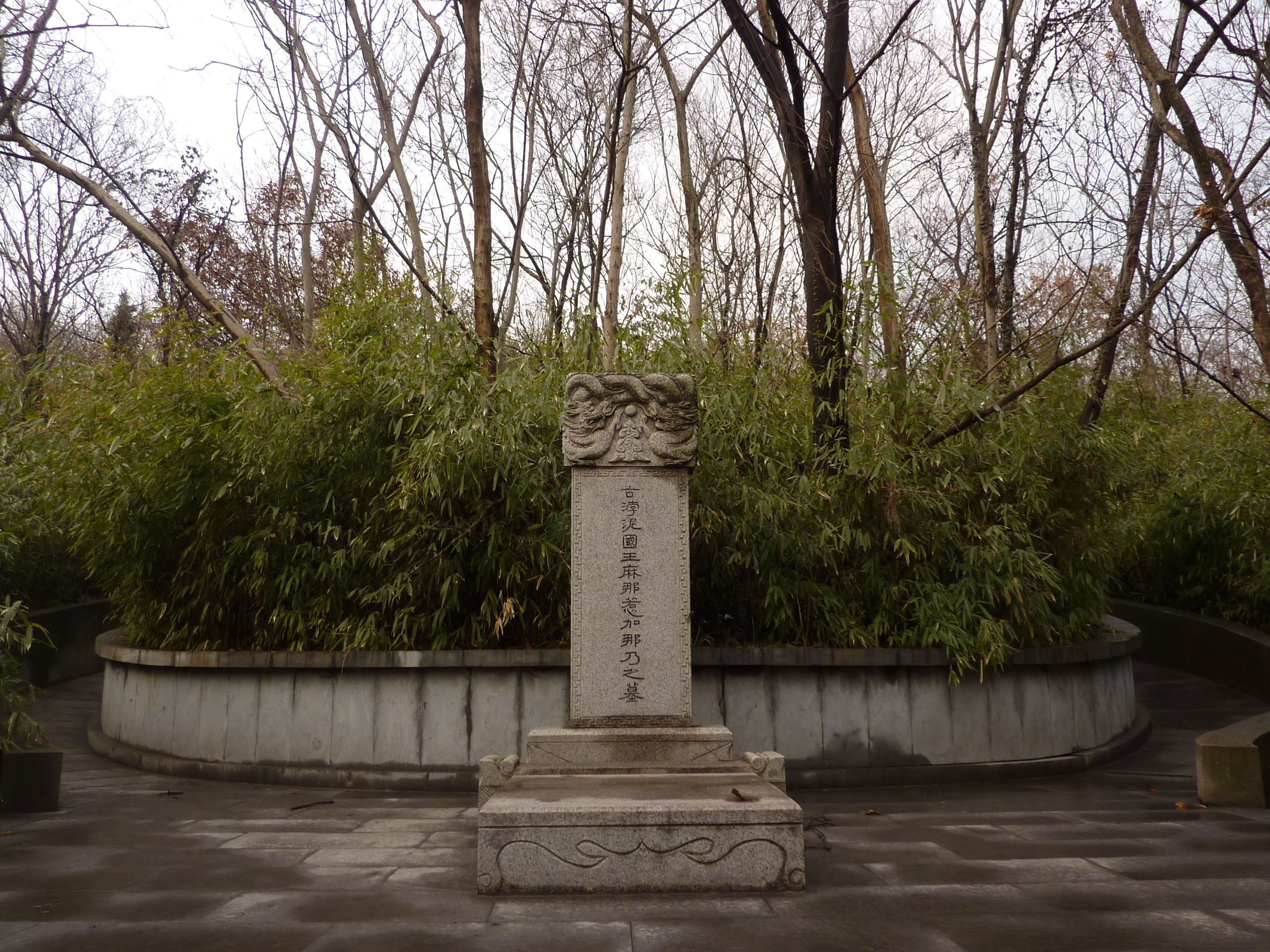
Tomb of Sultan Abdul Majid at the Tomb of the King of Boni, Nanjing, China

After spending more than a month in Nanjing, he became unwell. The Emperor gave the doctor orders to administer medication and to dispatch one by one each day the palace ministers to serve him. He died at home on 19 October 1408, in the ninth lunar month of that year at the age of 28. He expressed a desire to be interred in China in his testament. The Sultan was given the posthumous title of Gongshun (恭順) by the Emperor, who also ordered the suspension of court for three days. According to the norms of Chinese vassals, he was interred after his death outside of Andemen in Shizigang, which was in the southern section of Nanjing. The Emperor also mandated that the king's son take the throne in place of his father.

Before dying, he begged his son to see the emperor and make a solemn vow that he would never forget the Emperor's hospitality. Remember the generosity of the emperor, who asked his concubine to bury his body in China. The prince sent tribute-paying visitors and, in accordance with their final wishes, directed the Ministry of Industry to have a coffin made. They also ordered the construction of a gods' stele and instructed the people to guard it and erect a shrine inside the tomb. When Zhang Qian (张谦) and Zhou Hang returned to China in 1410, Sultan Xiawang, sent 180 individuals, including his uncle Lihalu, to pay tribute to and thank the Emperor for his generosity. Sultan Xiawang personally visited China with his mother and wife in the 1412. They were likewise welcomed by the Emperor with the utmost politeness. The following year, Sultan Xiawang abdicated after paying respects to his father's tomb in Nanjing.

=== Burial ===
The late Sultan Abdul Majid Hassan was buried at the Tomb of the King of Boni in Nanjing. The grave was abandoned up until 1958, when it was rediscovered during an archeological survey. It has now opened as a tourist attraction and designated as a historical site in China.

== Arguments ==
In a paper titled "Notes on Some Controversial Issues in Brunei History" in 1980, Robert Nicholl, a former curator of the Brunei Museum, stated that the word Ma-ho-mo-sa may be pronounced as Maha Moksha, which means Great Eternity. A Buddhist name would be Maha Mokhsa. Nicholl continues by claiming that not even Sultan Abdul Majid Hassan was a Muslim. Majarajah Gyana (nai) was rebuilt as Ma-na-jo-kia-nai-nai by another European historian, Pelliot. The absence of Sultan Abdul Majid Hassan from the various translations of Brunei's Salasilah Raja-Raja Brunei leads history professor Bilcher Bala to believe that Pateh Berbai took the throne and declared himself Sultan Ahmad.

== Personal life ==
Sultan Abdul Majid Hassan apparently had a 4 years old son named Xiawang (遐旺) at the time of his death. According to Chinese sources, Prince Xiawang became the successor in Nanjing. The Emperor gave out the royal garb, jade belts, ceremonial guards, pommel horses, robes, utensils, gold and silver, brocade, and coins while conducting the canonization ceremony. It was also noted during Zheng He's first trip to the West, he stopped in Brunei, where he installed his son as the new king and gave him seals and directives in 1408. Despite that, it was also noted that he had a daughter.

== See also ==
- List of sultans of Brunei
- Sultanate of Brunei
- Tomb of the King of Boni

Regnal titles
Preceded by Muhammad Shah	Sultan of Brunei; 1402–1408	Succeeded by Ahmad
