= Anglo-Bruneian War =

British war in Borneo

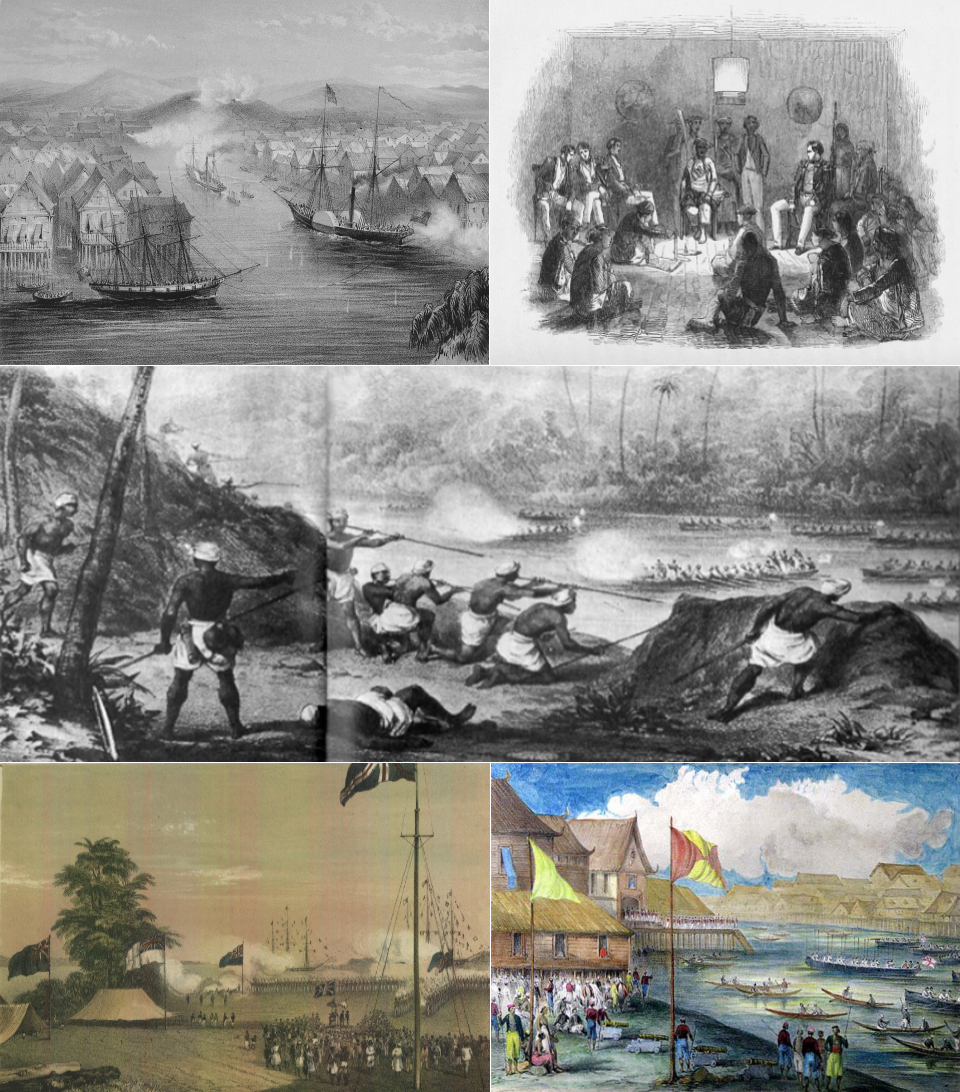
Date	1843–1847
Location	Brunei; Sarawak
Result	In the Western theatre; British tactical victory; Bruneian strategic victory: Political threats Muda Hashim and his brother Budrudin successfully assassinated.; In the Eastern theatre: British victory: Marudu pacified
Territorial changes	Treaty of Labuan; the United Kingdom officially annexes Labuan

Belligerents
United Kingdom; Raj of Sarawak; House of Digadong	Bruneian Empire; House of Bolkiah; Iban rebels; Kingdom of Marudu

Commanders and leaders
(United Kingdom of Great Britain and Ireland) Queen Victoria; James Brooke; Pengiran Muda Hashim X; Pengiran Badaruddin X; (United Kingdom of Great Britain and Ireland) Charles Wade †; Datu Patinggi Ali †; (United Kingdom of Great Britain and Ireland) Mr. Stewart †; (United Kingdom of Great Britain and Ireland) Rodney Mundy; (United Kingdom of Great Britain and Ireland) Thomas Cochrane; (United Kingdom of Great Britain and Ireland) Talbot	Omar Ali Saifuddin II; Haji Saman (WIA); Pengiran Indera Mahkota; Pengiran Yusof (surrendered) (executed); Sharif Sahib; Sharif Muller; Sharif Jaffar; Rentap; Nanang; Luyoh; Aji; Linggir Mali Lebu; Rekaya Antau; Rekaya Gun; Sharif Uthman (WIA); Syarif Rum

Units involved
Sarawakian Army; Royal Navy	Bruneian Army; Bruneian Navy; Marudu Army

Strength
more than 1,000 men; (United Kingdom of Great Britain and Ireland) 6-8 ships	~9,000 men; 7 perahu; 1,000 men

Casualties and losses
Sarawak >87 dead or wounded (United Kingdom of Great Britain and Ireland) Royal Navy >116 dead or wounded: Total >203 dead or wounded; >71 dead; >132 wounded	Bruneian Empire; around 499 dead or wounded; Kingdom of Marudu; around 245 dead or wounded; Total >744 dead or wounded

The Anglo-Bruneian War was a four year long war fought by the United Kingdom against the Bruneian Empire and the Kingdom of Marudu from 1843–1847.

== Prelude ==
Several foreign powers had started to come to Southeast Asia, starting with the Portuguese conquest of Malacca in 1511 and the Dutch conquests of Java and Southern Borneo made possible by the Anglo-Dutch Treaty of 1824. In this context, Labuan became more important to the foreign powers as they began to venture into Borneo from Labuan.

In 1775, the East India Company temporarily occupied Labuan after the failure at Balambangan with the Sultan of Brunei, Omar Ali Saifuddien I offering the island to East India Company in exchange for protection against the Sulu pirates.

The expansion of other western powers in the region caused Britain to realise the need for a permanent harbour in northwestern Borneo to prevent further foreign interference. The British worried that the Sultan might seek the assistance of other foreign powers who, at that time, were active in Southeast Asia, such as the Americans. Nevertheless, Labuan was considered a safe shelter, strategically situated to protect British interests in the region, especially the trade route with China. With the assistance of James Brooke, Britain now sought to take over Labuan.

== Armies ==
=== British-Sarawakian forces ===
The British-Sarawakian forces consisted of loyal Dayak especially the Bidayuh and Sarawak Malays soldiers and local followers led by both native chiefs who were involved with the Sarawak rebellion in 1836 and white officers from the British Army With the Royal Navy deploying six to nine ships, equipped with congreve rockets and modern cannons.

The Sarawakian soldiers, local followers and retinues were armed with an assortment of muskets from either Brooke or old reused muskets from the previous rebellion of 1836 and before, with the additional traditional weapons.

the Bruneian princes and their retinue, who later sided with Brooke were more better equipped compared to the followers of local Sarawak chiefs, having brass helmets and chainmail, mostly of the baju lamina and kechubong helmet variety.

=== Iban forces ===
The Iban rebels were primarily made up of warriors equipped with spears, blowpipes, mandau, piso pedang and kliau, alongside cannons and muskets, which were also placed on their bangkong ships.

=== Bruneian forces ===
The Bruneian forces consisted of raiders, retinues, retainers, levies and warriors, who had an arsenal of weapons from the Apostate war, Melanau rebellion of 1795, the Bruneian civil war in 1826 and the Sarawak rebellion in 1836.

Brunei had at least thirty eight of both brass and iron swivel cannons and ten Spanish cannons crafted during the reign of Charles III of Spain likely captured during the Apostate war, older muskets of both flintlock and matchlock alongside traditional arms. They deployed at least more than seven proas.

=== Marudu forces ===
The Marudu forces were mostly made up of warriors of Tausug, Iranun and Bajau descent who were loyal to many sharifs that served under Sharif Uthman.

There is not much known about the potential arsenal but it may have been, his forces would have at least used barongs and kampilans, common to Tausug, Bajau and Iranun warriors at that time, alongside cannons and muskets, however were overpowered by British superior force especially congreve rockets.

== War ==
In 1843, an open conflict between Brooke and the Sultan ended in the latter's defeat. The Sultan recognised Sarawak's independence.

From 1843, Brooke actively suppressed piracy on the coasts of western and northern Borneo together with Captain Henry Keppel in HMS Dido. After talks with Serib Sahib, who controlled the Sadong River, Keppel and Brooke's native forces attacked three rivers in the Saribas; the Padi, Paku and Rimbas. After which, Keppel was called away on orders, but returned in August 1844 along with EIC steamer Phlegethon. By this time Serib Sahib had abandoned the Sadong and retreated to Patusan. Keppel and Brooke's native forces once again overwhelmed all opposition in Patusan and the Undop, but were ambushed by the Iban on the river Skrang at Karangan Peris, resulting in the death of Datu Patinggi Ali. Shortly after this punitive expedition Brooke heard that Mahkota, the former administrator of the Kuching area, had taken shelter at the Lingga, and managed to capture him and send him back to Brunei.

According to the account of Captain Henry Keppel, on 4 June 1843, Brooke and Keppel organised a war expedition to attack the Iban of Saribas to take the land along the coast.

OKP Dana Bayang's longhouse at Nanga Padeh was the strongest and most important, defended by two forts and a barrier of fallen trees that blocked the Batang Saribas River from being easily entered by their enemies. Brooke's forces took and burnt this longhouse on 11 June 1843. Dana Bayang, who was already old, had delegated the fighting to his three sons: Nanang, Luyoh, and Aji.

Brooke's forces proceeded up the Saribas to Karangan Pinggai and on 14 June attacked the fort of Linggir Mali Lebu, a chief mentored by Dana Bayang. They then attacked the Sungai Rimbas river forts at Sungai Tawai belonging to chiefs Rekaya Antau "Linggang Neneri" and Rekaya Gun "Mangku Bumi".

The defeated chiefs in Saribas and Linggi from Skrang went onboard Brooke's ship to sign the peace treaty of Saribas. However, the treaty forced them to stop headhunting (ngayau in the Iban language), and they refused to sign it.

On 19 August 1844 at Karangan Peris in the Skrang area, Rentap first fought against Brooke's forces. He ambushed the advance trackers of Brooke's reconnoitring troop with a formidable array of war boats and thousands of men on either bank of the river, placed to effectively use spears and blowpipes. With boats and bamboo rafts blocking their retreat, the troop's white leader Mr Stewart, a Malay chief Datuk Patinggi Ali and 30 of his men were killed, and 56 others were wounded. This was the first time the Brooke officers saw how devastating the fighting and war by the Iban were.

On 26 August, a Skrang chief arrived, deputed by the other chiefs of Skrang to assure Captain Keppel of their submission and desire for peace.

Brooke hoped to reform the administration of the Sultanate and establish a pro-British government through Hashim and his brother Pengiran Badaruddin. In October 1844, Brooke with the aid of Captain Sir Edward Belcher in HMS Samarang and the EIC steamer Phlegethon returned the two brothers to Brunei. The vessels anchored at the Sultan's audience chamber, demanding Pengiran Yusof's position as Bendahara be replaced by Hashim and asking the Sultan to pledge to suppress piracy in his dominions, as well as to transfer the ownership of the island of Labuan to the British (although the British government had not asked for this). The status of Brooke as a Rajah and consul for the British at the time also remained controversial in the United Kingdom as he was not recognised by the British government to represent the British subjects. Indirectly, Brooke had become involved in an internal dynastic dispute of Brunei.

in August 1845, Rear-Admiral Thomas Cochrane who previously arrived at Brunei in July, reappeared with a handful ships to release two Lascar seamen who were believed to be hidden there. Badaruddin accused Yusof of being involved in the slave trade due to his close relations with a notable pirate leader Sharif Uthman in Marudu Bay and the Sultanate of Sulu. Denying the allegation, Yusof refused to attend a meeting with Cochrane, and escaped after being threatened with force by Cochrane before regaining his own force in Brunei's capital. Cochrane then sailed away to Marudu Bay in pursuit of Uthman, while Yusof was defeated by Badaruddin. Hashim managed to establish a rightful position in Brunei Town to become the next sultan after successfully defeating the pirates led by Yusof who fled to Kimanis in northern Borneo, where he was executed. Yusof was the favourite noble to the Sultan and with Hashim's victory, this upset the chances of the son of Sultan Omar Ali Saifuddin II becoming the next leader. Mahkota, after his capture in Sarawak in 1844 became the Sultan's adviser in Yusof's absence. He prevailed on the Sultan to order the execution of Hashim, whose presence had become unwelcome to the royal family, especially due to his close ties with Brooke that were favourable to English policy. Beside that, Field Marshal Haji Saman, who was connected to Yusof, played upon the Sultan's fear of Hashim taking his throne. Also in the next year in 1846, the third Bruneian Civil War began.

By the order of the Sultan, Hashim and his brother Badaruddin together with their family were assassinated in 1846. One of Badaruddin's slaves, Japar, survived the attack and intercepted HMS Hazard, which brought him to Sarawak to inform Brooke. Enraged by the news, Brooke organised an expedition to avenge Hashim's death with the aid of Cochrane from the Royal Navy with Phlegethon. On 6 July 1846, Sultan Omar Ali Saifuddin II complained through a letter about the discourtesy of HMS Hazard and invited Cochrane to ascend the capital of Brunei with two boats.

HEICS Phlegethon, HMS Spiteful and HMS Royalist then moved up to the river on 8 July where they were fired on from every position with slight damage. Mahkota and the Sultan retreated upriver while most of the population fled upon their arrival at Brunei's capital, leaving the brother of the Sultan's son, Pengiran Muhammad, who was badly wounded and Pengiran Mumin, an opponent of the Sultan's son who despised the decision of his royal family to be involved in conflict with the British. The British destroyed the town forts and invited the population to return with no harm to be done to them while the Sultan remained hiding in the jungle. Another expedition was sent to the interior but failed to find the Sultan. Brooke remained in Brunei with Captain Rodney Mundy and HMS Iris along with the Phlegethon and HMS Hazard while the main expedition continued their mission to suppress piracy in northern Borneo.

Upon finding that Haji Saman was living in Membakut and that he was involved in the plotting that caused Hashim's death, HEICS Phlegethon and HMS Iris departed there destroyed Haji Saman's house and captured the town of Membakut although Saman managed to escape. Brooke returned again to Brunei and finally managed to induce the Sultan to return to the capital where the Sultan wrote a letter of apology to Queen Victoria for the killings of Hashim, his brother and their family. Through his confession, the Sultan recognised Brooke's authority over Sarawak and mining rights throughout the territory without requiring him to pay any tribute as well granting the island of Labuan to the British. Brooke departed Brunei and left Mumin in charge together with Mundy to keep the Sultan in line until the British government made a final decision to acquire the island. Following the ratification agreement of the transfer of Labuan to the British, the Sultan also agreed to allow British forces to suppress all piracy along the coast of Borneo.

It was on 24 December 1846 when Captain Mundy, commanding HMS Iris (1840), took possession of Labuan, "in the Name of Her Majesty Victoria Queen of Great Britain and Ireland under the Direction of His Excellency Rear Admiral Sir Thomas Cochrane, C.B., Commander-in-Chief".

On 27 May 1847, the Sultan signed the Treaty of Friendship and Commerce with the British, officially ceding Labuan and establishing a British foothold in the north of Borneo to counterbalance the Dutch presence.

== Aftermath ==
The loss of Labuan was a big blow to Brunei, as Labuan was considered as its only gateway through the sea to the outside world. It was after the loss of Labuan that Brunei began to lose most of its territories, mainly to the Brooke Regime in Sarawak and British North Borneo Chartered Company in North Borneo. However thanks to the assassination of Muda Hashim by Pengiran Muhammad Yusof, it sabotaged any chances of the United Kingdom and James Brooke of putting a Pro-British sultan in the Bruneian throne as the Muda Hashim line was destroyed by the last ruling sultan, Sultan Hashim Jalilul who was a part of the assassination on Muda Hashim.
