= Marudu expedition =

Battle of the Anglo-Bruneian War

- Part of the Anglo-Bruneian War
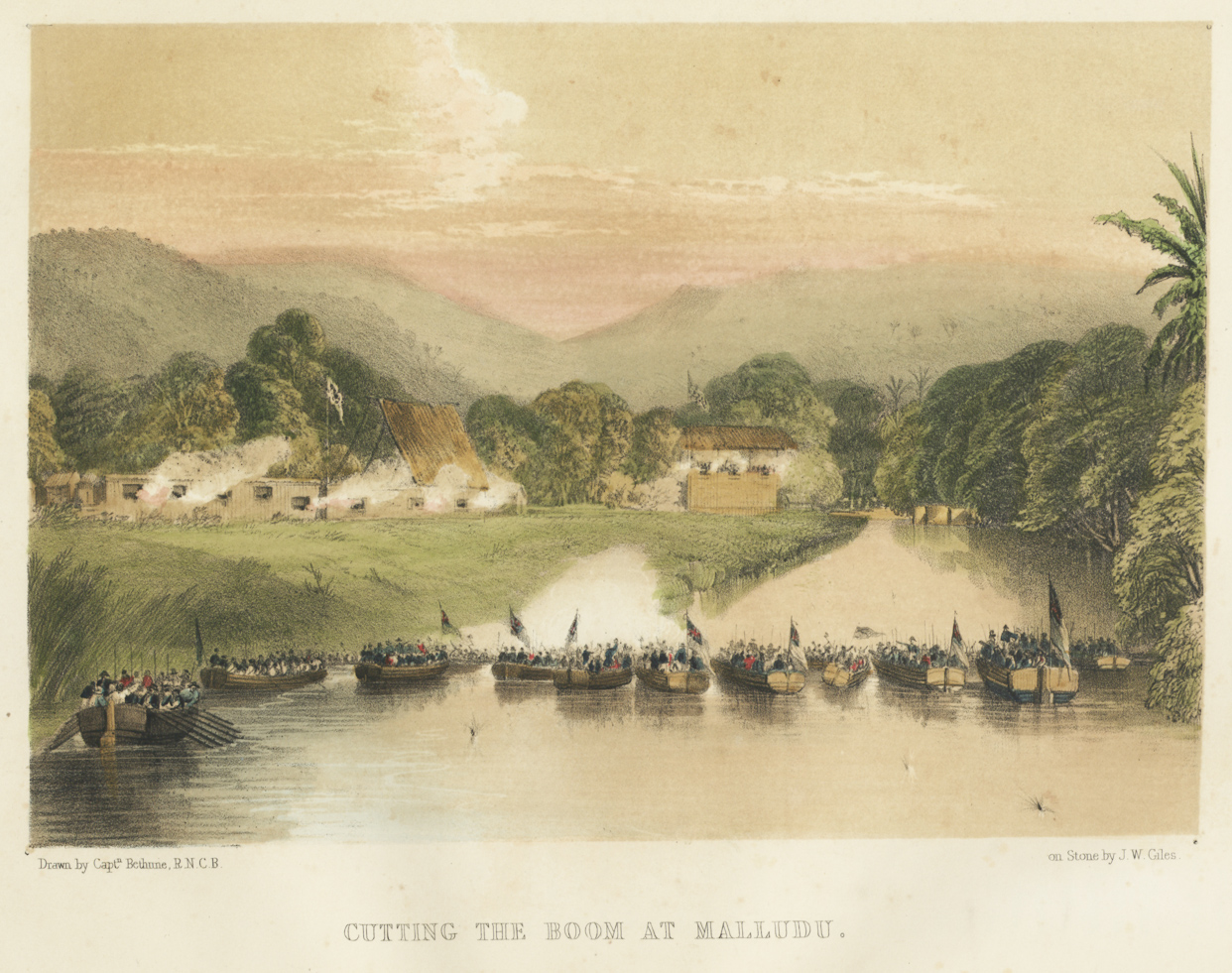
- "Cutting the boom Malludu", depicting the Battle of Marudu Bay.
Date	17 August – 20 August 1845
Location	Marudu Bay, Borneo
Result	British Victory; Marudu pacified, later reverted by Sharif Yassin

Belligerents
Marudu (Note: There were at least ten other states aligned with Marudu); Dusun territories; Sembulan; Melapi	United Kingdom

Commanders and leaders
Sharif Uthman (WIA); Sharif Rum; Sharif Yassin; Sharif Hassan; Panglima Kanan; Sharif Shee; Embo Rajid; Sandukong (Note: Not to be confused with Sandokan, the fictional pirate, however he is the ancestor of Pengiran Sammah in 1884); 7 unnamed "Arab" leaders	Thomas Cochrane; Talbot

Units involved
Iranun; Tausug; Dusun; Malays; Bajau	Royal Navy

Strength
1,000 warriors 11 cannons 1 fort	<1,000 troops 24 cannons 9 gunboats

Casualties and losses
240 killed or wounded 5 leaders killed	6-8 British killed 20 wounded

The Marudu expedition or the Langkon War was an expedition against Yusuf's ally Sharif Uthman's state of Marudu in 1845.

== Background ==
After Brooke and Cochrane succeeded in expelling "Pengiran Usop" (Pengiran Yusof), Uthman's ally, from Brunei in the Battle of Brunei Town, they sailed to Marudu to confront Uthman himself. Brooke's claim of Uthman's piracy which Brooke intensified through letter-writing campaigns from February 1845 onward, upon learning of his appointment as agent, thus influencing all important authorities in London and India, as well as the naval officers on the ground, had proven successful. Brooke had managed to convince Cochrane that Sharif might resist British expansion of Uthman's influence over Sabah not yet occupied by Western powers, and that it would therefore be more advantageous to destroy Sharif on the grounds of piracy. The most possible reason were pirates like Abdulla al-Hadj, who was imprisoned and died in Bombay, two years before the expedition, as well was motivated to stop a potential threat against Brooke.

== Planning ==
An armed conflict was planned from the outset. After all, Admiral Cochrane led a fleet of eight ships that reached Marudu Bay on August 17, 1845. Five of them, namely the Vixen, Pluto, Nemesis, Wolverine, and Cruiser, sailed deep into the bay. Cochrane gave Captain Talbot, who had also been present at negotiations in Brunei, command of the upcoming operation and sent him with boats loaded with 24 cannons, nine of which were gunboats, to Sharif Uthman's position to attack him if he refused to surrender. If the enemy proved too superior, thus jeopardizing a certain victory, Talbot was to withdraw and contact the admiral. Cochrane did not want to take any risks.

Early on August 19, 1845, Talbot's units set out for Uthman's fortress. Neither the captain nor other British troops knew Uthman's exact position and strength. So Talbot was guided by two local Bruneians. Brooke claimed that many locals could be found who would willingly betray Sharif Uthman's position. However, the British apparently had trouble recruiting volunteers for this task. Cree commented:

"A couple of natives of Brunei were taken as pilots: they did not relish the job, but had no choice but to do their work properly."

— Levien (1981)

The two guides probably didn't do their job as accurately as Cree had hoped, because they didn't provide Talbot with precise enough information about the location of the fortifications. Talbot made a relatively serious error by not sending scouts to explore the area. He relied on the information provided by the two locals:

"The forts appeared to us to stand on a tongue of land, from which we were separated by the river, which at that point divided into two branches, and the pilots declared such to be the case."

— Talbot to Cochrane

The larger fortress was accessible by land from one side:

"Osman's main fort could have been attacked by land and, as soldiers say, his flank could have been turned. The troops could then have got through to the houses of the village which lay behind the defenses and caused great damage."

— S. Evans (1978)

As Talbot and his forces negotiated the final, sharp bend in the river, he surveyed the positions. They consisted of two forts separated by a stream, one armed with three and the other with eight cannons. Behind the forts lay settlements, fields, and plantations. The forts were decorated with colorful flags, which the British interpreted as a sign of the presence of many leaders and distinguished figures. Uthman's own banner, the red flag with the tiger's head, flew over the fortifications.

Talbot led all the boats directly to the obstacle that blocked the way to the forts: a barrier made of wood and iron, barely 200 meters from the fort. Sharif Uthman's cannons, especially the three in the smaller fort, were designed to target ships that had to stop before this barrier.

Sharif Uthman sent a noblemen, Sharif Muhammad, to know about the reason for the British arrival. This action suggests that Uthman may have been less informed about the British intentions than Brooke and Cochrane stated in their accounts. Talbot replied that Uthman should surrender within 30 minutes. Muhammad returned to Uthman, who in turn demanded that British officers come to the fortress to negotiate. Talbot refused because the British suspected a trap laid by Uthman. Brooke later remarked that he was relieved by Talbot's decision.

"Even their last desperate attempts to retain Brooke's friendship or stave off his attack were interpreted by Brooke as treacherous. [...] Usman hoisted a flag of truth to the attacking British at Marudu in 1845 which was regarded as a trick, [...].."

— Bassett (1980)

== Battle ==
Meanwhile, Sharif Uthman was ordered to board Cochrane's ship. After Sharif Muhammad returned to the fortress a second time without accomplishing anything, the British sailors and soldiers began to hack at the barrier with axes to allow the boats to pass through. When Uthman saw this forced entry, he ordered the opening fire. Talbot was able to claim that the enemy had fired the first shot and thus caused the battle.

Talbot's men were exposed to cannon fire for about an hour. Of the 6 to 8 British dead and about 20 wounded, most fell during this initial exchange of fire. It is unclear whether Uthman's men fired at any significant volume afterward. Stephen Evans attributed the relatively rapid end of the battle to an operator's error by the fortress gunners

Abbas/Bali explained Uthman's defeat as treason and underestimation of the naval gunfire, as Uthman had not expected the guns to reach his fortress. The interpretation that Uthman lost the battle due to the enemy's superior force may be the most accurate. Shortly after the initial exchange of fire, Talbot landed some of his men on the right bank and aimed rockets at the fortress. The rocket party landed on the right bank and fired with good effect into the stockade.

Sharif Uthman likely didn't expect the British to have weapons with such a range at their disposal. The rockets caused devastating damage to the fortress. Nevertheless, the defenders tried to use the still-functioning cannons to prevent the British from penetrating the fortifications. The persistent bombardment and defense of the barrier may have been Uthman's only real chance to prevent the storming of his fortress and city. What Rutter described as the devil-may-care spirit of Uthman's men was more likely an expression of a desperate defense. When the British finally broke through the barrier, some hand-to-hand combat still took place, but most of the defenders probably had no doubt that the battle was finally decided. They fled, even though they might have had the best chance against the numerically inferior British in close combat, it may had been motivated by the loss of capable fighters due to the rocket fire was too great for an effective defense.

During the battle and before retreating into the jungle, the forces of Marudu used scorched earth tactics and burned down Kota Marudu with London News reporting:

"Their leaders, five of whom were dead or desperately wounded, and the remainder having fled -- convinced them that victory was hopeless, and deserted in all directions. A few of the more daring, in bringing off the last of their wounded and dead, were shot down by the marines and seamen. Spoils of every description were found; and, in one hour, the village and forts for a mile up were wrapt (sic) in flames. Thirty proas were burnt, and two very fine ones on the stocks, two magazines of powder and houses filled with camphor, china ware, English manufactured goods, French prints, and splendid timber were found and fired in every direction. Several slaves effected their escape. They had orders to pitch the enemy's dead into the river as fast as they fell, or carry them away to the jungle, the Illaloon pirates considering it a great disgrace to leave their bodies in the hands of an enemy."

== Aftermath ==
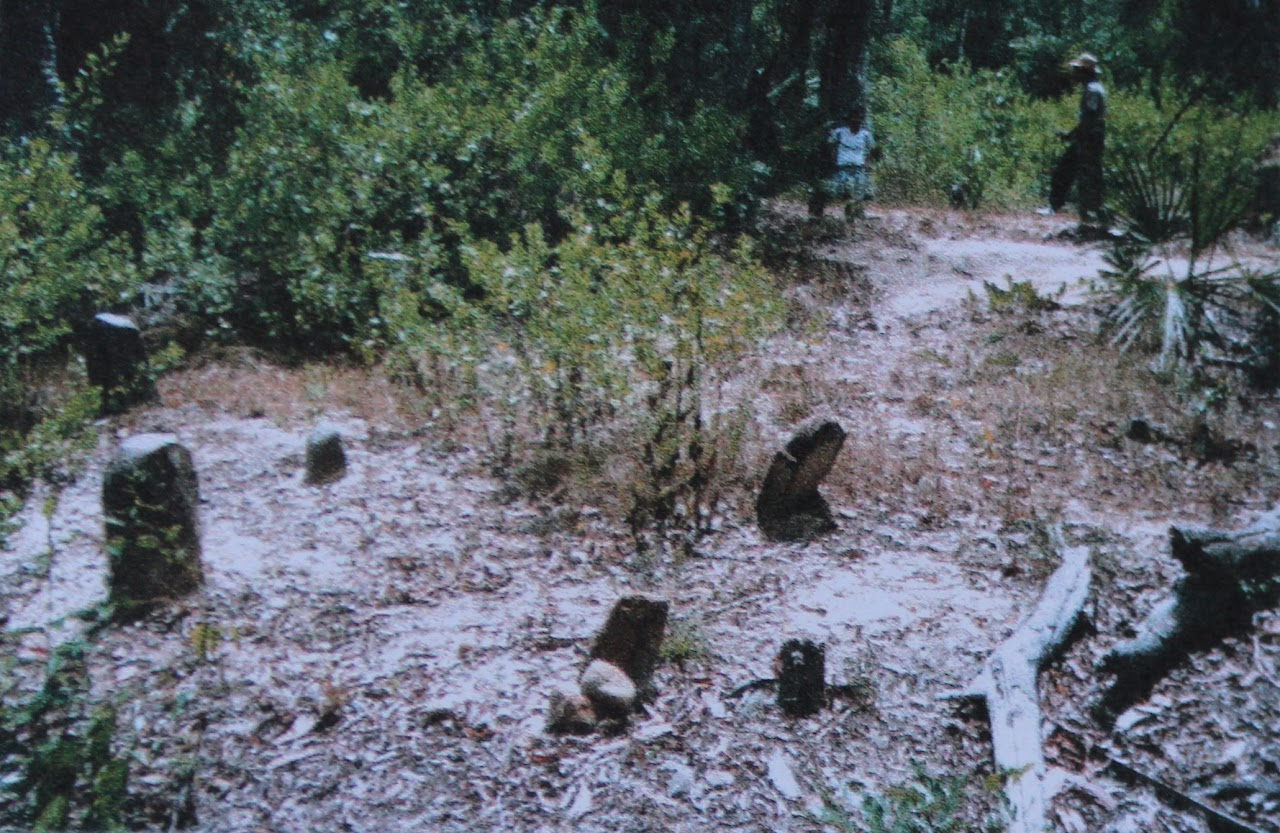
Cemetery on the grounds of Sharif Uthman's fortress

Whether Sharif Uthman himself was killed during the battle is not clear from the eyewitness accounts. He was presumably wounded and carried off. Talbot made no mention of Uthman's fate in his report. Cochrane reported that he was wounded, but did not know whether he was dead or alive. In a later letter to the Admiralty, Cochrane gave the impression that he assumed Sharif survived; he triumphantly stated:

"And as I believe, I have left him [Osman] with nothing but the clothes he wore, and a small house in the country to which I understand he sent his wives and children the evening before the attack, he has no means of recommencing his piratical proceedings!"

— Cochrane

Cree presumed that Uthman had been wounded. Brooke, too, was unsure whether Uthman was dead a day after the battle. In the Journal, he initially reported that Uthman had been driven into the mountains. The newspaper Friend of China reported on September 17, 1845, that at the time of the report, ten Europeans and 30 men from Manila were still in Uthman's captivity as slaves. All these reports call into question the later frequently and persistently repeated statement that Uthman succumbed to his wound in the neck. The British found several Sharifs and leaders among the dead in the fortress area, but Sharif Uthman was not discovered.

Wright assumes that Uthman fled to Tungku to join his friend Raja Laut. Some authors point out that Uthman's followers fled to Tungku after the battle. Baring-Gould/Bampfylde however, argued that in 1846 some Iranun retreated from the towns of Tempasuk and Pindusan, destroyed by Captain Mundy, to Tungku to continue their piratical activities, but the Marudu survivors settled on Palawan and in Bongon (Marudu Bay) and were therefore not directly pirates.

When the British entered the fortifications and the town behind them, a hunt began for everything that could be taken, even though such actions had been forbidden by the officers. The fortress and the town were virtually plundered.

"The sailors and marines chased after them [Marudu defenders] in such an unruly manner that one of the officers, Lieutenant Pascoe of the Vestal, was disgusted: “all was helter-skelter as if going to a fair,” he said later. The navy had done a great deal of damage with gunfire and there were many dead and wounded, but some of the sailors and marines treated the whole affair as a great lark."

— Lieutenant Pascoe of the Vestal

Many cannons were taken aboard the ships or rendered unusable. The order to burn down the fortress and the perahus prompted the soldiers to start their own fires, which in some cases threatened to trap them in flames. To the officers' regret, several camphor warehouses were accidentally burned down in the process. The valuable raw material could have been sold for a good price. Finally, the British captured some domestic animals and concluded their operation with a picnic.

The expedition was a test of their combat readiness against pirates. In the aftermath as well, people who searched the ruined fort for possible survivors and remains on the morning of August 20, 1845, were portrayed by the British as looters and "driven away with a few shots".

Brooke and Cochrane once again made another casus belli for the war against Marudu as a pirate haven by presenting 'obvious evidence'. They pointed in detail to a ship's bell inscribed with the name of the German ship Wilhelm Ludwig[de]. Although Uthman had clearly not committed any piracy against this ship, Brooke focused on interpreting this bell, along with other artifacts, as evidence of piracy. Cochrane confirmed Brooke's opinion in his letter to the Admiralty.

== See also ==
Expeditions of the White Rajahs of Sarawak
