= Marudu expedition order of battle =

The following units of the Royal Navy forces under the command of Admiral Sir Thomas Cochrane under orders of Rajah James Brooke, fought against the Marudu forces, led by mostly Sharif Uthman during the Marudu expedition.

== Abbreviations used ==
- w = wounded
- k = killed
- m = missing

== Royal Navy ==
Admiral Sir Thomas Cochrane 6-9 ships

- Captain Talbot

Ship	Type	Guns	Fleet	Const- ruction
Nemesis	Paddle frigate	7	British East India Company	(United Kingdom)
Phlegethon	Paddle frigate	98	British East India Company	(United Kingdom)
Vixen	Sloop-of-war	?	Royal Navy Ensign	(United Kingdom)
Wolverine	Sloop-of-war	74	Royal Navy Ensign	(United Kingdom)
Cruiser	Sloop-of-war	18	Royal Navy Ensign	(United Kingdom)
Pluto	Paddle steamer	?	Royal Navy Ensign	(United Kingdom)
All other ships unknown

== Marudu ==
Rajah Syarif Osman(wm) 1,000 warriors, 11 cannons, 1 fort
