= Battle of Membakut =

Part of the Anglo-Bruneian War (1846)

- Part of Anglo-Bruneian War
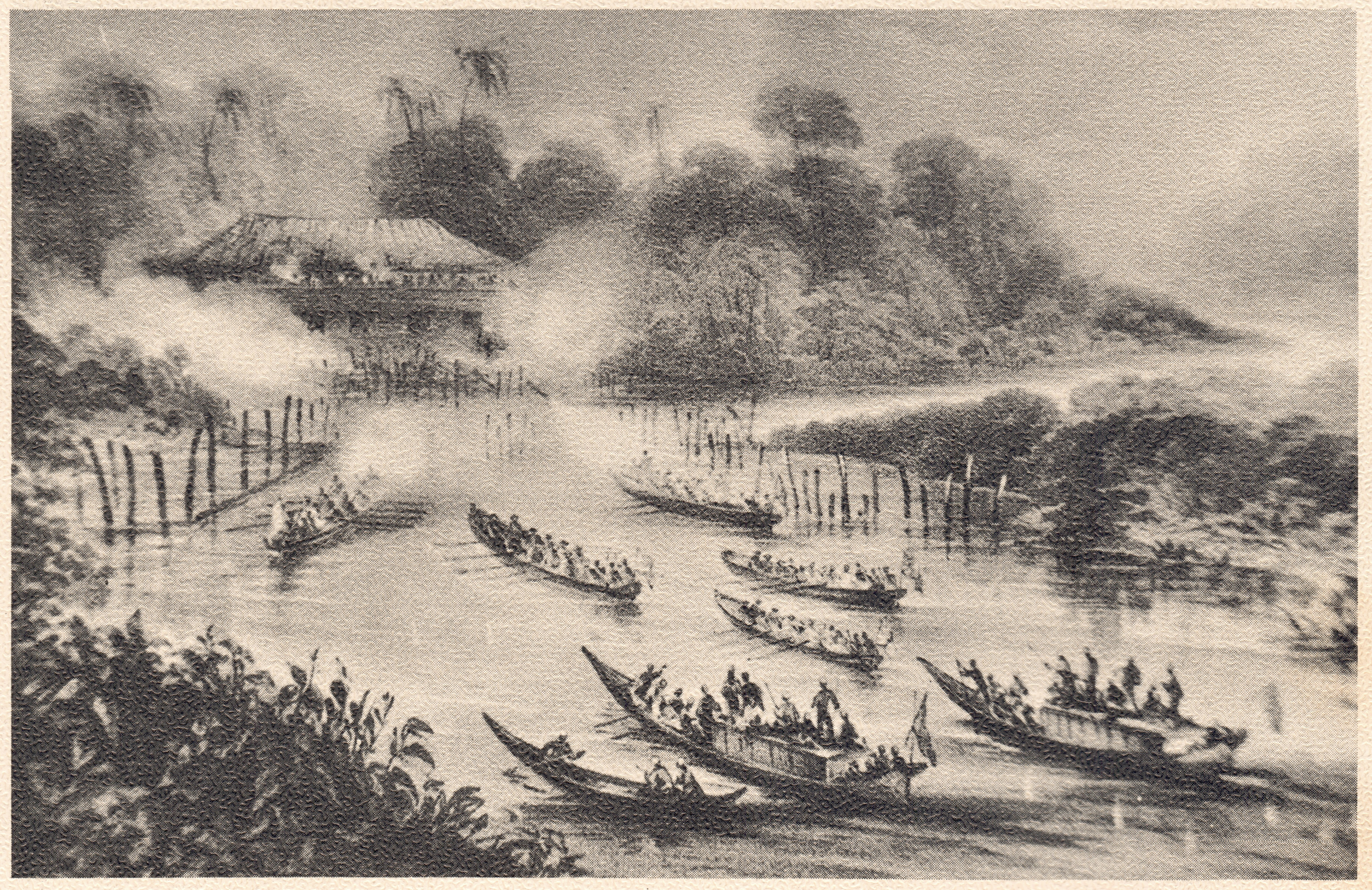
- Attack on Haji Saman's fortress
Date	16 August 1846
Location	Membakut, Bruneian Sabah
Result	Anglo-Dusun victory

Belligerents
Haji Saman's forces	Dusun; Royal Navy

Commanders and leaders
Haji Saman (MIA)	Rodney Mundy; Pengiran Madoud of Mangatal

Units involved
Bruneian Army	Royal Navy; Dusun warriors

Strength
1,000	around 40 praus 400 warriors 2 British ships

Casualties and losses
50+ dead	1 seaman dead, around 14 men wounded

The Battle of Membakut were a series of attacks that occurred in Membakut, located in Sabah. The battle was part of the Anglo-Bruneian War between the military commander Haji Saman's forces and the Dusun and British.

== Background ==
Upon finding out that Haji Saman was living in Membakut and that he was involved in the plotting that caused Hashim's death, HEICS Phlegethon and HMS Iris departed there in a mission to avenge Pengiran Indera Mahkota,

== Battle ==
A force of approximately 400 men in forty war prahus from different rivers in the vicinity and armed with thirty brass swivel guns later joined the forces of the Royal Navy. Madoud of Mangatal guided the British through the river.

After hours of wandering in the river, the combined forces encountered large empty rafts sent floating downstream by the Bruneians. These obstacles caused confusion amongst the men.

While passing through a sharp turn, they were confronted with a line of bamboo stakes fixed across the stream; however, the tide had caused the stakes to move away so that the boats passed through without difficulty. The river's current caused the Royal Navy and Dusun to struggle to pull closer into position. Lieutenant Little carried the position on the bank and the defenders fled. After the fort, batteries and magazines had been destroyed the British and their Dusun allies pushed on after the Bruneian forces immediately and which they saw a large house 200 feet long, built close to the river and partly hidden by coconut-trees.

British marines and seamen landed on the house but no defenders were there, as the Bruneian forces carried their dead and wounded with them into the jungle.

== Aftermath ==
After burning down the residence and temporarily occupied the village, with the Dusun chief pledging to protect all shipwrecked Europeans that landed on Membakut.

== Sources ==
- Saunders, Graham (2013). A History of Brunei. Routledge. ISBN 978-1-136-87394-2.
