= Kingdom of Marudu =

Petty kingdom centered around Kota Marudu

Rajahnate of Marudu Kingdom of Marudu كراجأن مارودو Kerajaan Marudu
- 1830–1878
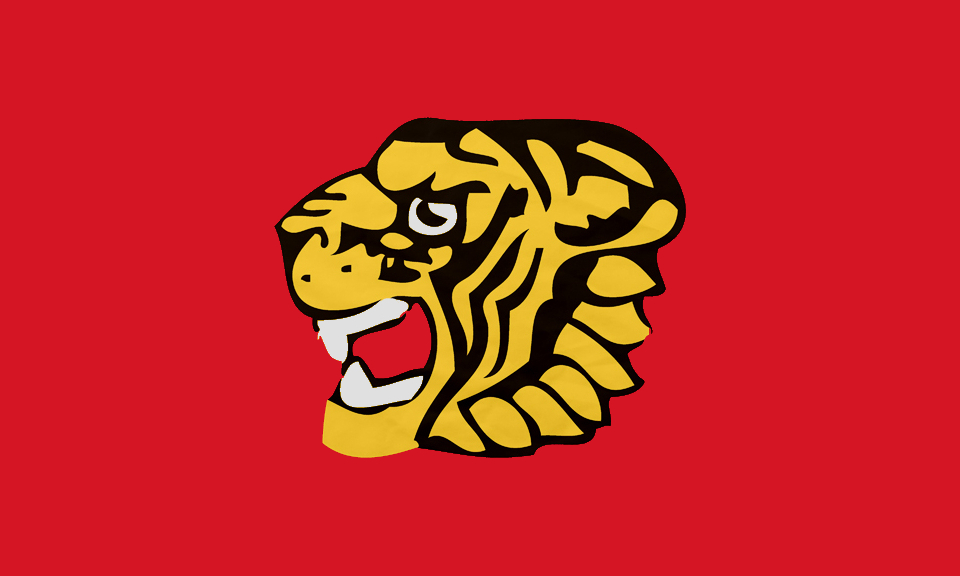
- Flag of the Kingdom of Marudu
- Status: Recognised independent (1830–1846); Unrecognised de facto independent (1846-1878)
- Capital: Marudu Bay (until 1830); Kota Marudu
- Common languages: Malay and Tausug
- Religion: Sunni Islam
- Demonym: Maruduan
- Government: Monarchy
- Raja
  - 1830-1846: Sharif Uthman
  - 1846-1880s: Sharif Yassin
- History
  - Kingdom established: 1830
  - Concession of Sabah: 1878
Preceded by
Sultanate of Sulu
Sultanate of Brunei
Succeeded by
United Kingdom
Sultanate of Sulu
North Borneo
- Today part of: Malaysia

The Kingdom of Marudu (Malay: كراجأن مارودو, romanized: Kerajaan Marudu) or simply Marudu or Maludu, was a dominant kingdom amongst of many petty kingdoms in Eastern Sabah, it was centered around Marudu Bay and Kota Marudu, Sabah. The kingdom was founded in 1771.

== History ==
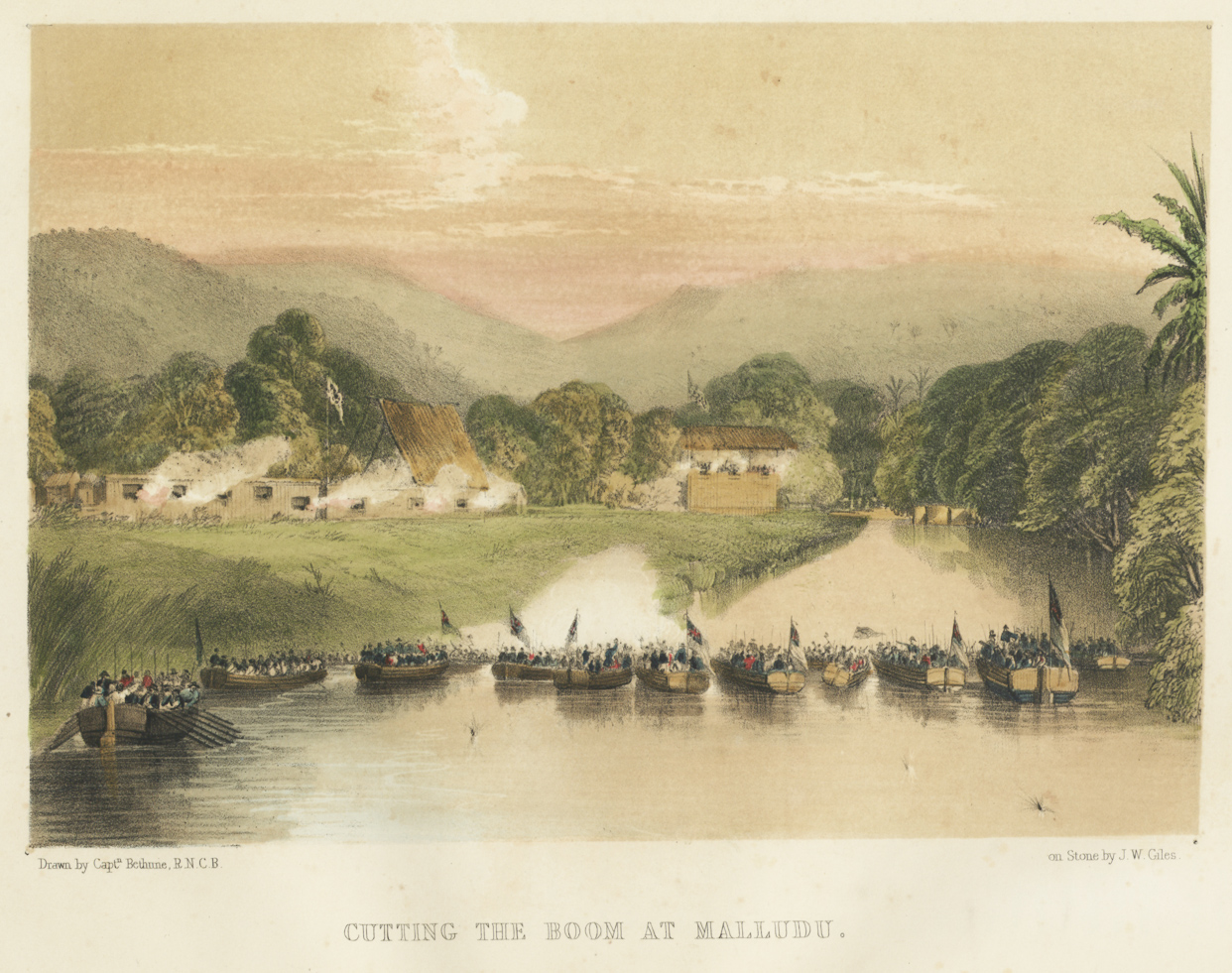
Battle of Marudu Bay, 1845

The Kingdom of Marudu traces its origins in the Apostate War, where it was used as a base of operations for Sulu privateers, pirates and soldiers.

Before the appointment of Sharif Uthman, Marudu was split into two, Sungai Besar ruled by Sharif Muhammad under the Sulu Sultanate and Bengkoka ruled by an unidentified orang kaya under the Bruneian Empire.

After becoming the governor of Marudu, Uthman transformed Marudu into a Kingdom, leaving his protectorate status from the Sulu Sultanate. He had strong influence on eastern Sabah, making alliances amongst other Sabahan princes. British attempts to drive the Sultan of Sulu's followers out of the region failed. And a punitive expedition by the "White Rajah" James Brooke in 1845 with the alibi of Marudu being a base of operations for pirates.

After firing a cannon shot at the British at Kota Marudu, battle ensued, Talbot's men were exposed to cannon fire for about an hour. Of the six to eight British dead and about twenty wounded, most fell during this initial exchange of fire. It is unclear whether Uthman's men fired at any significant volume afterward. Stephen Evans attributed the relatively rapid end of the battle to an operator's error by the fortress gunners

Abbas/Bali explained Uthman's defeat as treason and underestimation of the naval gunfire, as Uthman had not expected the guns to reach his fortress. The interpretation that Uthman lost the battle due to the enemy's superior force may be the most accurate. Shortly after the initial exchange of fire, Talbot landed some of his men on the right bank and aimed rockets at the fortress. The rocket party landed on the right bank and fired with good effect into the stockade.

Sharif Uthman likely didn't expect the British to have weapons with such a range at their disposal. The rockets caused devastating damage to the fortress. Nevertheless, the defenders tried to use the still-functioning cannons to prevent the British from penetrating the fortifications. The persistent bombardment and defense of the barrier may have been Uthman's only real chance to prevent the storming of his fortress and city. What Rutter described as the daredevil spirit of Uthman's men was more likely an expression of a desperate defense. When the British finally broke through the barrier, some hand-to-hand combat still took place, but most of the defenders probably had no doubt that the battle was finally decided. They fled, even though they might have had the best chance against the numerically inferior British in close combat. Perhaps the loss of capable fighters due to the rocket fire was too great for an effective defense.

== Economy ==
Sharif Uthman order to gather camphor, tortoise shells, sea cucumbers and timber from its territories to trade with neighbouring states, Singapore, the Sultanate of Sulu and the Bruneian Empire. They were also involved in the lucrative bird nest trade in Sabah, through strategic alliances, they mostly brought said high quality bird nests from the Kinabatangan region and sold them in premium prices, targeting Chinese merchants to buy them.

== Culture ==
=== Social class system ===
Among the people living in the areas controlled or subservient to Sharif Uthman, being in the nobility could be acquired only by lineage, a closed hereditary system.

There were two kind of noble classes:

- Sharif (syarif or syarifah), acquired purely by lineage, this title was only acquired by those who was a descendent of the Islamic prophet, Muhammad. It was and is a significant title through its religious context.
- Datu (susultanun) and Orang kaya, acquired also by lineage, this title could also be acquired if appointed so, either previously by the sultans of Brunei or Sulu or by Sharif Uthman himself.

It should be noted though, the Dusuns who were influenced by Sharif Uthman probably had a different system of rule.

== See also ==
- Sandokan
