= Battle of Balambangan Island =

1775 Battle in Balambangan

- Part of Apostate War
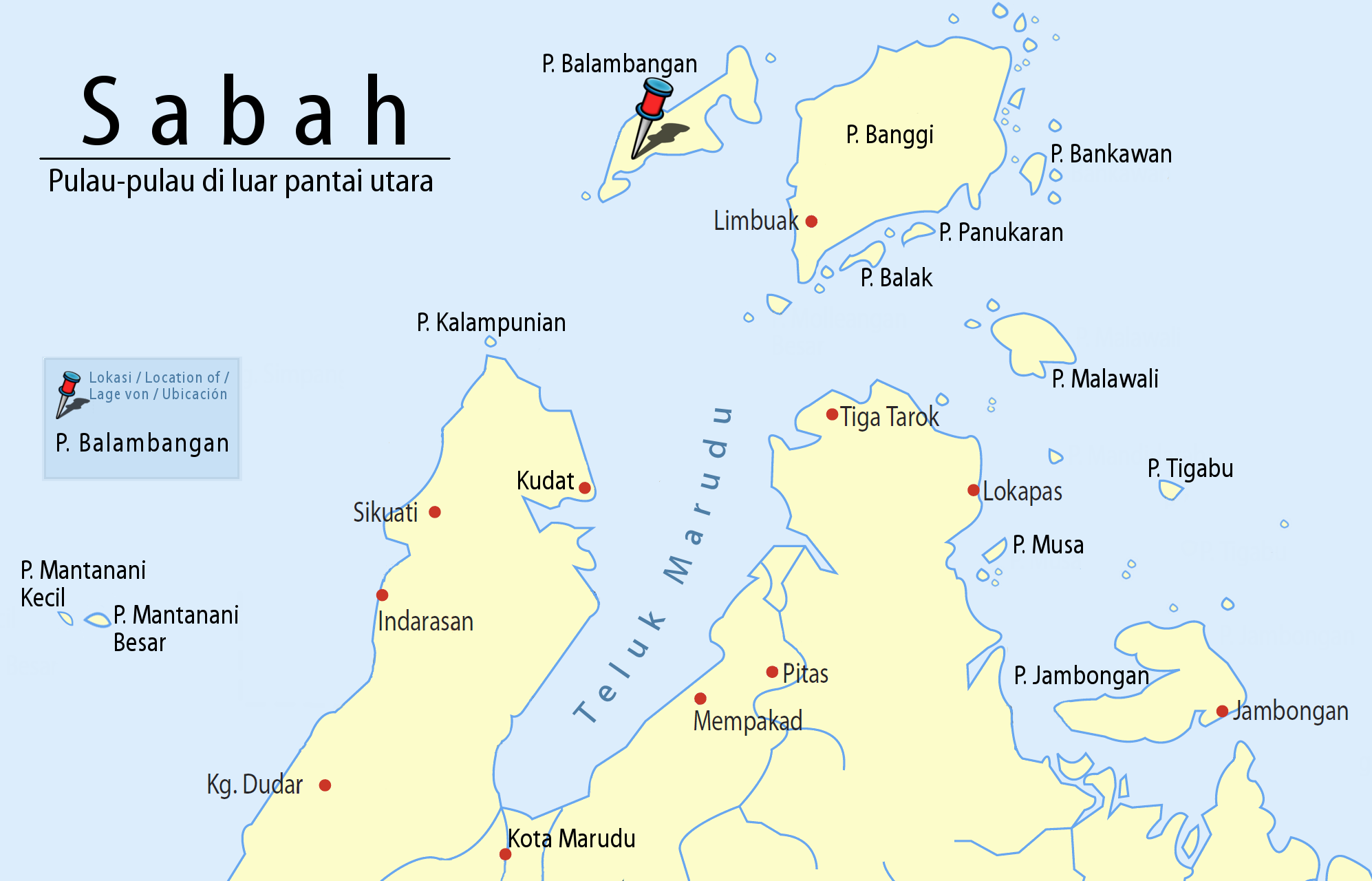
- The location of Balambangan
Date	1775
Location	Sabah, Balambangan Island
Result	Bruneian victory

Belligerents
Bruneian Empire	Sulu Sultanate

Commanders and leaders
Omar Ali Saifuddien I Pengiran Temenggong Ampa	Muhammad Israil; Datu Teting (surrendered)

Strength
around 1,000 men	Outnumbered (unspecified)

Casualties and losses
- Unknown

The Battle of Balambangan Island was a battle that occurred in the island of Balambangan. The battle was part of the Apostate War between forces of the Bruneian Sultanate and the forces of the Sulu Sultanate.

== Background ==
In pre-1762, the Sulu Sultanate took over Manila from Brunei. Sultan Omar Ali Saifuddien was displeased. In retaliation, the Sultan sent a mission to take place Manila from Azim ud-Din I. The mission didn't arrive until 1769 and indirectly fought the Spanish instead of the Sulu Sultanate.

The previous years leading up to the battle, the East India Company and Brunei signed a pepper treaty.

The Sulu Sultanate then despatched a force under the command of Datu Teting to attack Balambangan in 1775

Datu Teting posed as a builder offering services, he arrived his troops, gaining employment from the East India Company governor and concealing additional followers on Balambangan itself and the adjacent island of Banggi to maintain surprise. While he was still posing as a builder, he was bolstering his forces in secrecy with the help of Sultan Muhammad Israil.

On 26 February 1775, Datu Teteng, a cousin of the Sultan of Sulu and a prominent Sulu leader, directed a raiding party against the East India Company settlement in retaliation for his public humiliation by the governor.

Despite intelligence indicating an imminent reprisal, the governor neglected to reinforce the settlement's defenses, which consisted primarily of a modest garrison ill-equipped to withstand a determined assault. The Sulu forces exploited this vulnerability in a swift, coordinated strike, overpowering the British defenders through superior numbers and surprise tactics honed from regional raiding traditions.

The attackers proceeded to ransack warehouses and residences, seizing trade goods including opium, ammunitions, bird nests, pearl shells, and sea cucumbers accumulated from exchanges with regional merchants. They then systematically set fire to the structures, including the factory buildings and fortifications, reducing the entire outpost to ruins and rendering it uninhabitable.

This destruction inflicted substantial material losses on the East India Company, valued at approximately £170,000, encompassing inventory, infrastructure, and forfeited trade opportunities, while compelling the surviving British personnel to evacuate hastily to nearby Labuan or other refuges. The raid exemplified the precariousness of European footholds in Southeast Asia, where local power dynamics and personal vendettas could swiftly undo colonial initiatives lacking robust military backing.

== Battle ==
After the Sulu took over the island, the Sultan immediately sent Pengiran Temenggong Ampa to thwart the forces of Sulu, who plotted to invade Brunei next, when the two forces clashed, Datu Teting surrendered the island and his troops fled back to Sulu after learning that the warriors of Brunei, led by Pengiran Temenggong Ampa, were far too strong for them to defeat.

== Aftermath ==
With the destruction of the settlement, the East India Company ceded back Balambangan to Brunei, as their losses were too big to return. There were also allegations from the East India Company about the treachery of the local allies in the initial attack.
