= Abdulla al-Hadj =

Pirate

- عبد الله الحاج (Arabic)
- Born: England
- Died: 1843; Bombay, India
- Piratical career
- Type: Pirate
- Years active: 1800s
- Rank: Captain
- Base of operations: South China Sea

Abdulla al-Hadj (Arabic: عبد الله الحاج; died 1843) was an English pirate primarily known for his activity in the South China Sea. By his own account, Abdulla was born in England but was taken to Arabia while he was still young. While in Arabia, he converted to Islam and eventually found his way to Murdu where he found a job as the rajah's chief advisor. Abdulla was most known for his capture of a British trading vessel that was stopped at Murdu in northern Borneo. While the ship was taking on cargo, Abdulla and a partner boarded the ship and killed the captain and another officer, took over the ship and stripped it bare. Rajah Sharif Uthman, hoping to avoid punishment turned Abdulla over to the Honourable East India Company while keeping the loot for himself. After a trial, Abdulla was imprisoned for life in Bombay.

According to Owen Rutter, a pirate by the name of Haji Abdullah appears in the historical record exactly once, in 1843, when he is turned over to the East India Company in Penang, then a part of the British Imperial Straits Settlements, by one of the many autonomous princes controlling the regions small port cities. Rutter describes Haji Abdullah as having been captured along the "Pedir coast," and given into the custody of the "Rajah of Murdu" who turned over to the British. The details of his life are known only from his own testimony to the British court that tried him for piracy. He stated that he was born in Canterbury, Kent, England, and did not know his birth name, claiming rather to have been in Jeddah with his father where both converted while he was a small boy.

== See also ==
- Piracy in the Strait of Malacca
- Jack Ward
- Sandokan
