= Treaty of Labuan =

1846 treaty between Great Britain and Brunei

Treaty of the Cession of the Island of Labuan to Great Britain
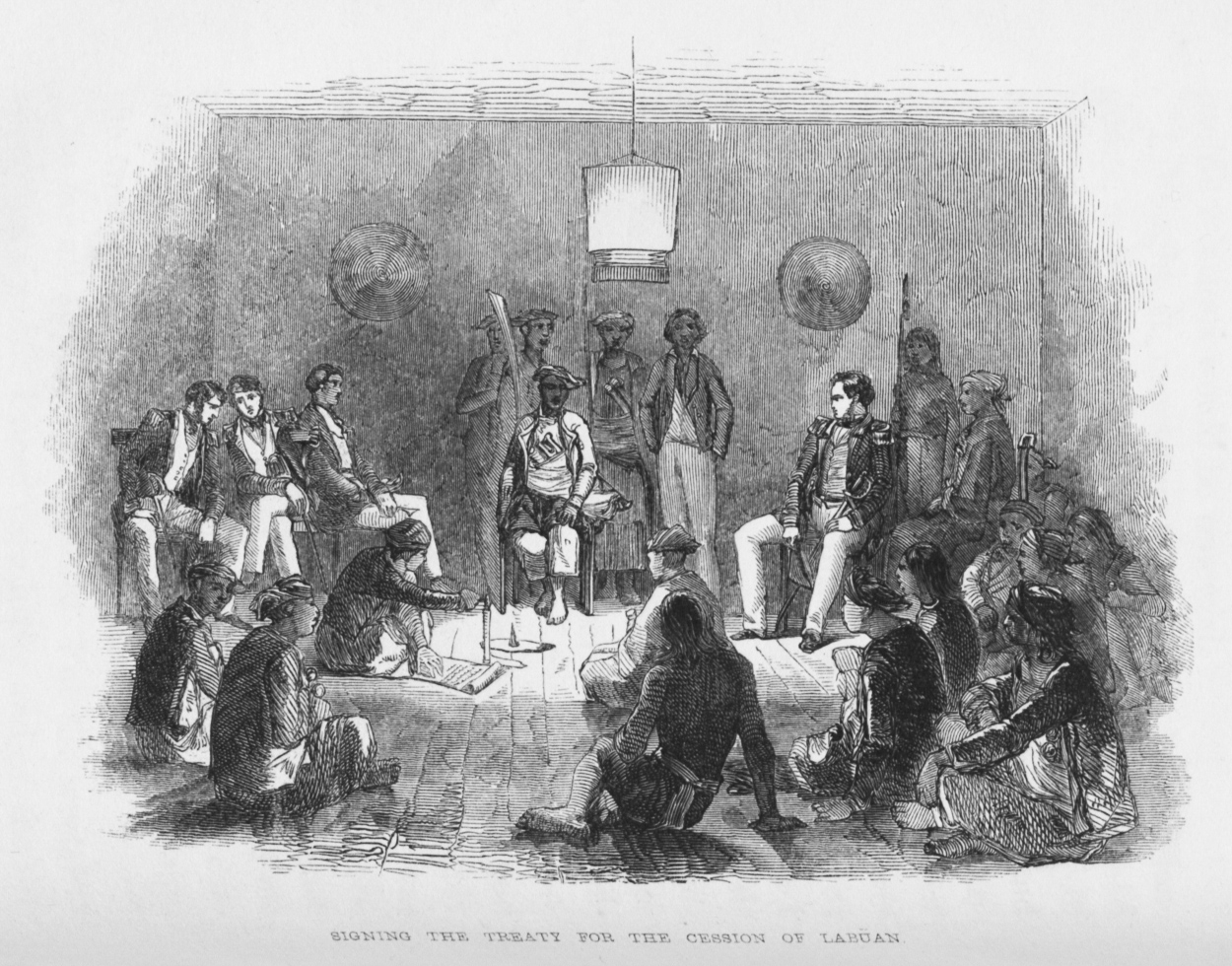
- The signing of the Treaty of Labuan at the Brunei palace, 18 December 1846
- Type: Bilateral / Unequal
- Signed: 18 December 1846
- Location: Brunei Town, Brunei
- Sealed: 18 December 1846
- Effective: 24 December 1846
- Condition: Accession of Labuan to Great Britain
- Signatories: Omar Ali Saifuddin II, on behalf of Brunei; Rodney Mundy, on behalf of the United Kingdom
- Parties: Brunei and the United Kingdom: Brunei; United Kingdom
- Languages: English and Malay

Full text
- Treaty of Labuan at Wikisource

The Treaty of Labuan was signed between Great Britain and the Brunei Sultanate on 18 December 1846. Under this treaty, the Sultan of Brunei ceded the island of Labuan and its adjacent islets to Great Britain.

== Background ==
Labuan had belonged to Brunei since the reign of the first Sultan of Brunei, Muhammad Shah. The island, previously uninhabited, was used by Malay and Chinese merchants and traders to shelter their ships from storms. Labuan was important economically for Brunei as it was regarded as the Sultanate's gateway to the outside world. Labuan was considered as a safe shelter and strategically positioned to protect Bruneian interests in the region, especially the Chinese trade route between Brunei and Manila. After the fall of Manila to the Spaniards, trading activities in Labuan increased the island's revenues as taxes increased, due to the increasing number of traders and merchants who came for water supply and most importantly, coal, which Labuan had vast reserves on the island.

== Foreign interests in Labuan ==
Labuan attracted foreign interest due to the economic potential of the island. However, to Brunei, Labuan was their secret weapon in quelling pirates activity, especially that of the Sulus, who had once been under Bruneian rule. In 1700s, the Sultan of Brunei offered Labuan island to the British in exchange for assistance to protect Brunei from Sulu pirates. However, the offer came to nothing.

By 1800s, several foreign powers started to come to Southeast Asia, started by the Portuguese conquest of Malacca in 1511, the Spanish conquest of Manila in 1570, and the Dutch conquest of Java, Moluccas and Southern Borneo, as a result of the Anglo-Dutch Treaty of 1824, as well as the French conquest of Indochina from 1858 until 1885, Labuan became more important to the foreign powers they began to venture into Borneo from Labuan.

== 1840s ==
Following the events which affected the Brunei Sultanate in Sarawak, the British, pressured by its commercial interests, decided that it was a good opportunity for them to occupy Labuan. For the British, Labuan would be used as a port to harbour their ships. The rich coal supply in Labuan further increased British interest in the island.

The expansion of other western powers in the region caused Britain to realise the need for a permanent harbour in northwestern Borneo to prevent further foreign interference. The British worried that the Sultan might seek the assistance of other foreign powers who at that time were active in Southeast Asia, such as the Americans. Nevertheless, Labuan was considered a safe shelter and strategically situated to protect British interests in the region especially the China trade route. With the assistance of James Brooke, Britain now sought to take over Labuan.

== Cession of Labuan ==
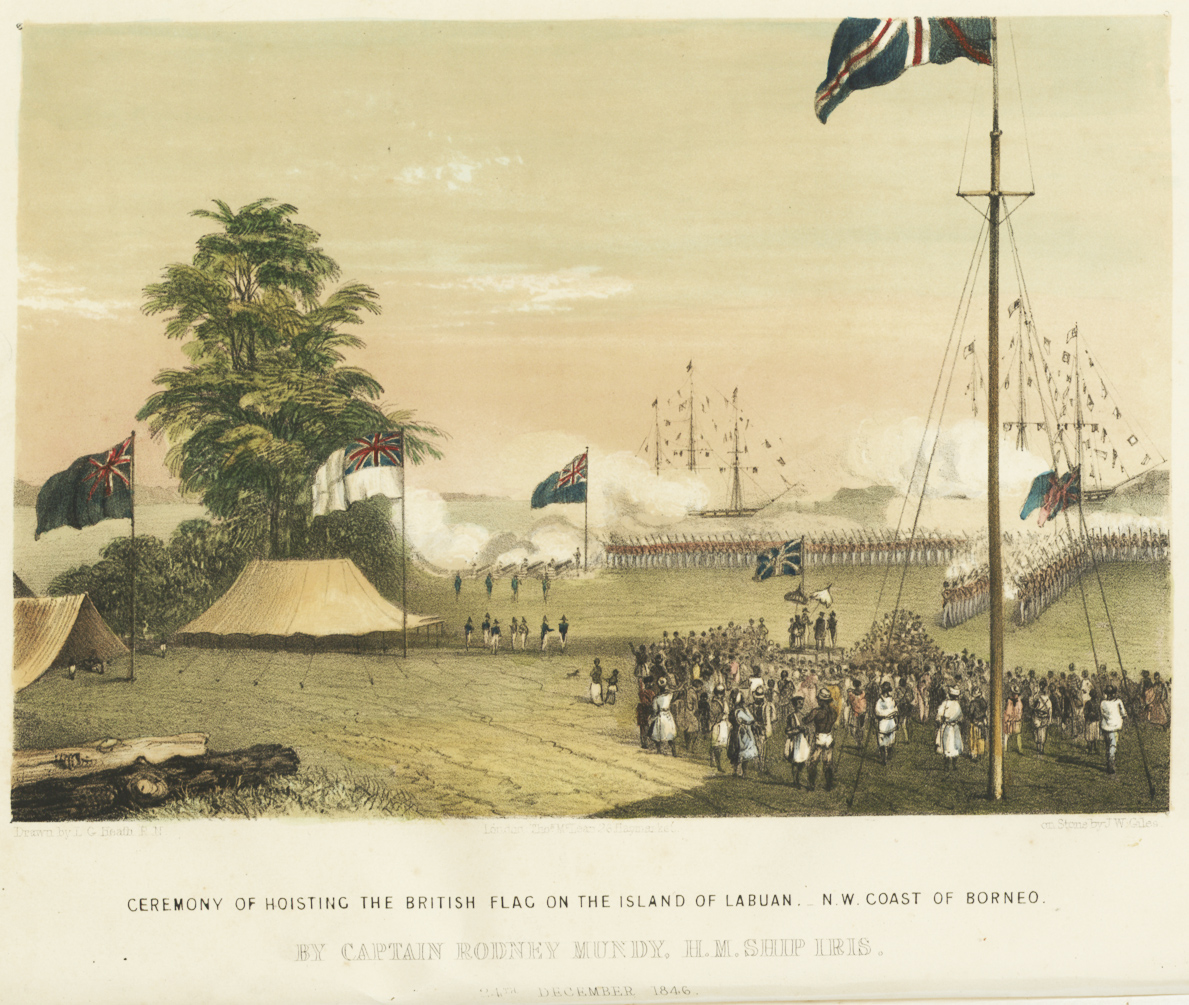
British flag hoisted on the Island of Labuan for the first time to mark the accession of the island to Great Britain on 24 December 1846.

Soon after the signing of the 1846 treaty, the British put pressure on Sultan Omar Ali Saifuddin II to cede Labuan to the British. The Sultan refused and employed delaying tactics.

However the British navy lined up British warships near the Sultan's palace with cannons ready to fire if the Sultan refused to sign the treaty. The Sultan had no choice but to put the royal seal, symbolising the surrender of Labuan Island to Great Britain as a crown colony, ceding it to the British Queen "in perpetuity", to provide British traders with a harbour where they could protect their trade interests. After the signing, James Brooke was knighted and later appointed the first British governor of Labuan.

Six days later, the British occupied the island. It was on 24 December 1846 when Captain Mundy, commanding HMS Iris (1840), took possession of Labuan, "in the Name of Her Majesty Victoria Queen of Great Britain and Ireland under the Direction of His Excellency Rear Admiral Sir Thomas Cochrane, C.B., Commander-in-Chief".

== Aftermath ==
The loss of Labuan was a big blow to Brunei, as Labuan was considered as its only gateway through the sea to the outside world. It was after the loss of Labuan that Brunei began to lose most of its territories, mainly to the Brooke regime in Raj of Sarawak and British North Borneo Chartered Company in North Borneo.

== Alleged expiration of the Treaty and request for the return of Labuan to Brunei ==
In 1957, the British High Commissioner for Brunei Sir Anthony Abell made a proposal to the Brunei government and to the Secretary for the Colonies Alan Lennox-Boyd, in which the Crown Colony of Labuan was to be returned to Brunei after a long time since the island was ceded to Great Britain in December 1846. The Sultan did not agree with the proposal as he saw it as a motive by the Great Britain to accept the proposed merger of the three British Borneo Colonies of Brunei, Sabah and Sarawak into one administration. Sultan Omar Ali Saifuddien III demanded that the Island of Labuan be returned to Brunei alleging that the Treaty of Labuan expired after Labuan had been in possession of Great Britain for 100 years. Since it was clearly stated in the Treaty that Labuan was ceded forever although ceded by force, Sir Anthony Abell "denied the validity of the Sultan's arguments and said that he did not expect the British government would support Brunei claim for the return of Labuan". The talks between Brunei and Great Britain about the return of the island to Brunei continued until Labuan, together with Sarawak and North Borneo, joined to form the Federation of Malaysia in 1963.

== Annex ==
=== Treaty of Labuan ===
1. Peace, friendship, and good understanding shall subsist for ever between Her Majesty the Queen of Great Britain and Ireland, and His Highness the Sultan of Borneo Proper, and their respective Heirs and Successors.

2. His Highness the Sultan hereby cedes in full sovereignty and property to Her Majesty the Queen of Great Britain and Ireland, Her Heirs and Successors for ever, the Island of Labuan and its dependencies, the Islets adjacent thereto.

3. The Government of Her Majesty the Queen of Great Britain and Ireland hereby engages, in consideration of the cession above specified, to use its best endeavours to suppress Piracy, and to protect lawful commerce, and the Sultan of Borneo, and his ministers, promise to afford every assistance to the British authorities.

== See also ==
- Anglo-Brunei Treaty of Friendship (1847)
