= Kota Marudu =

Kota Marudu Pekan Kota Marudu
- Town and district capital
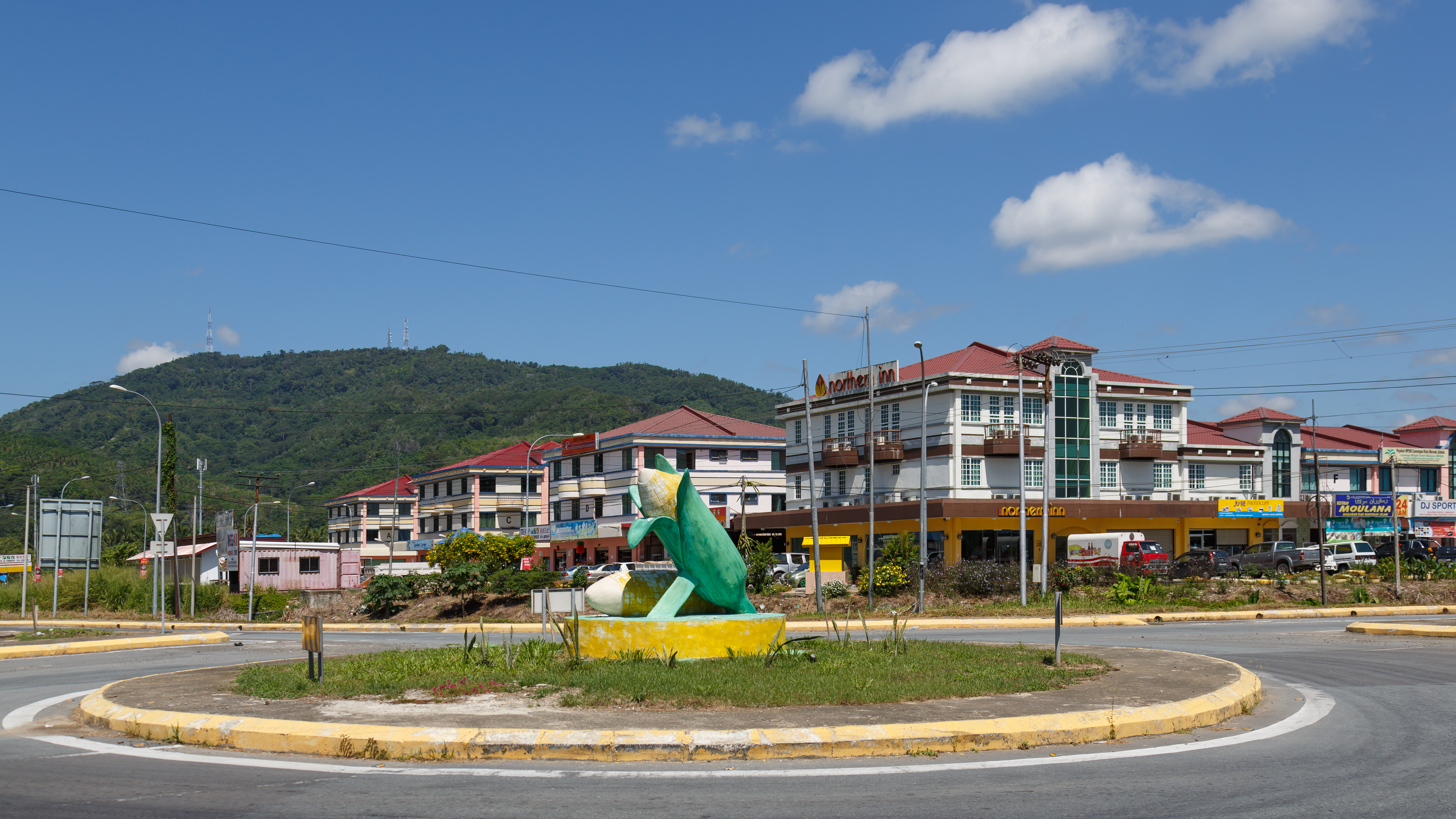
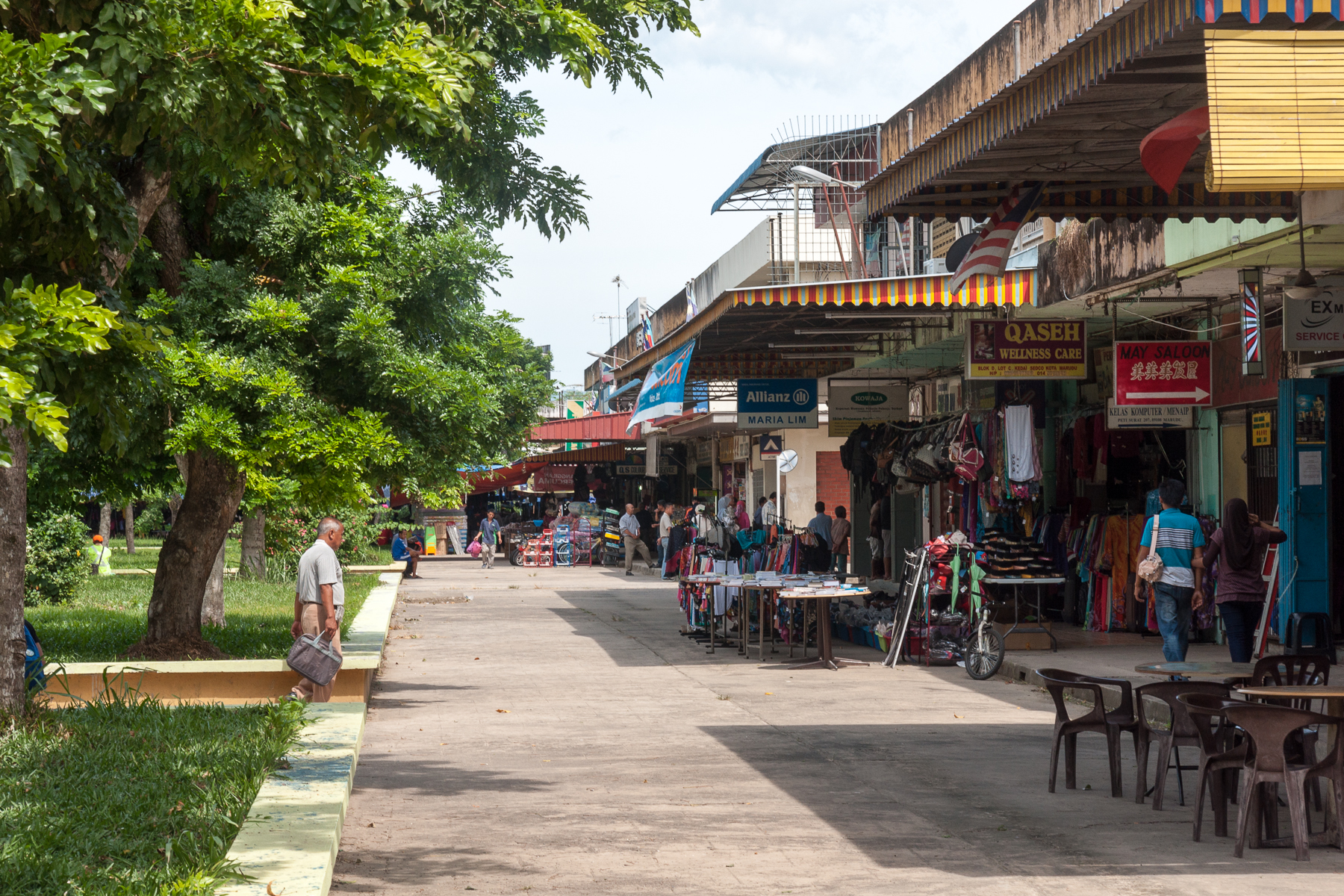
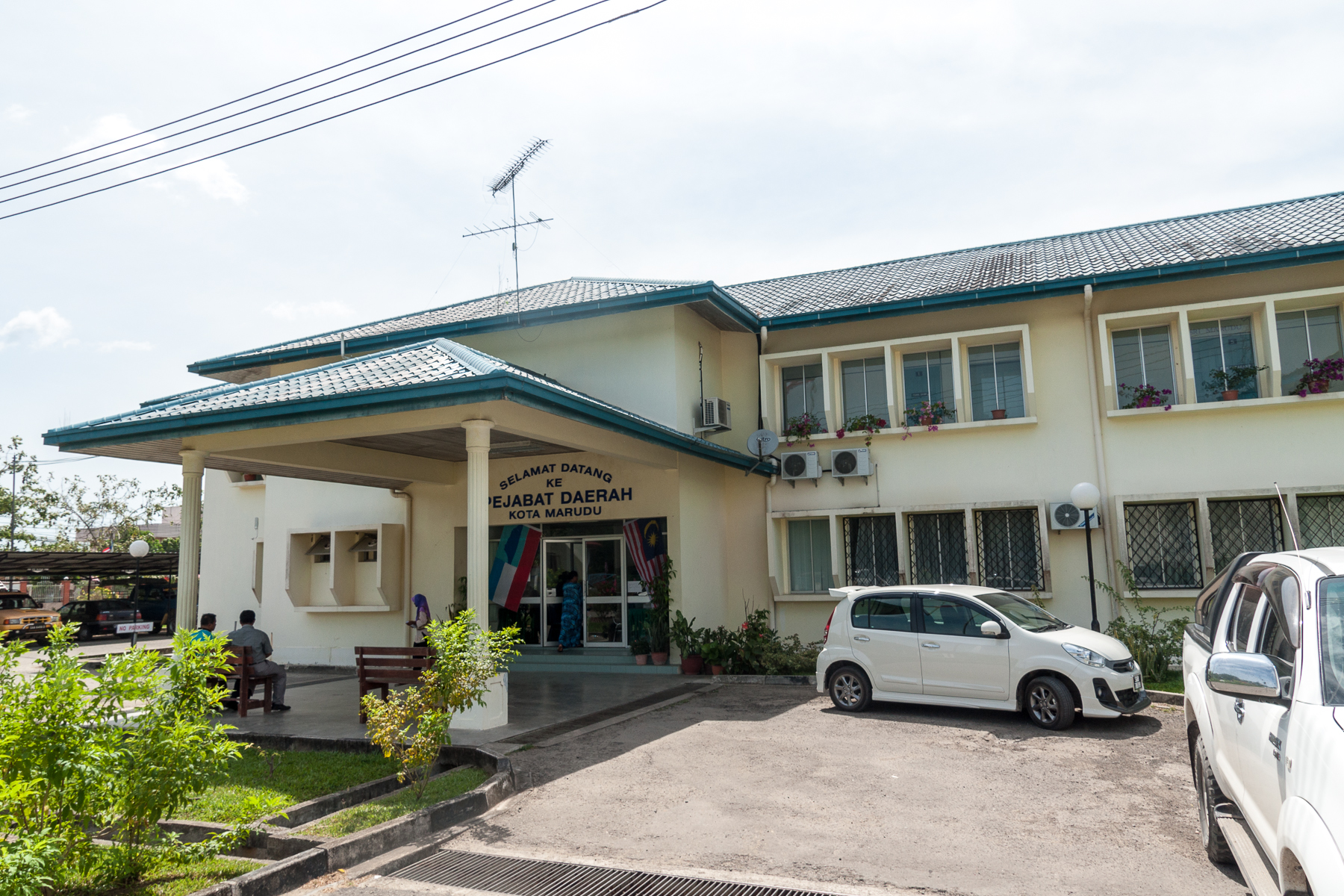
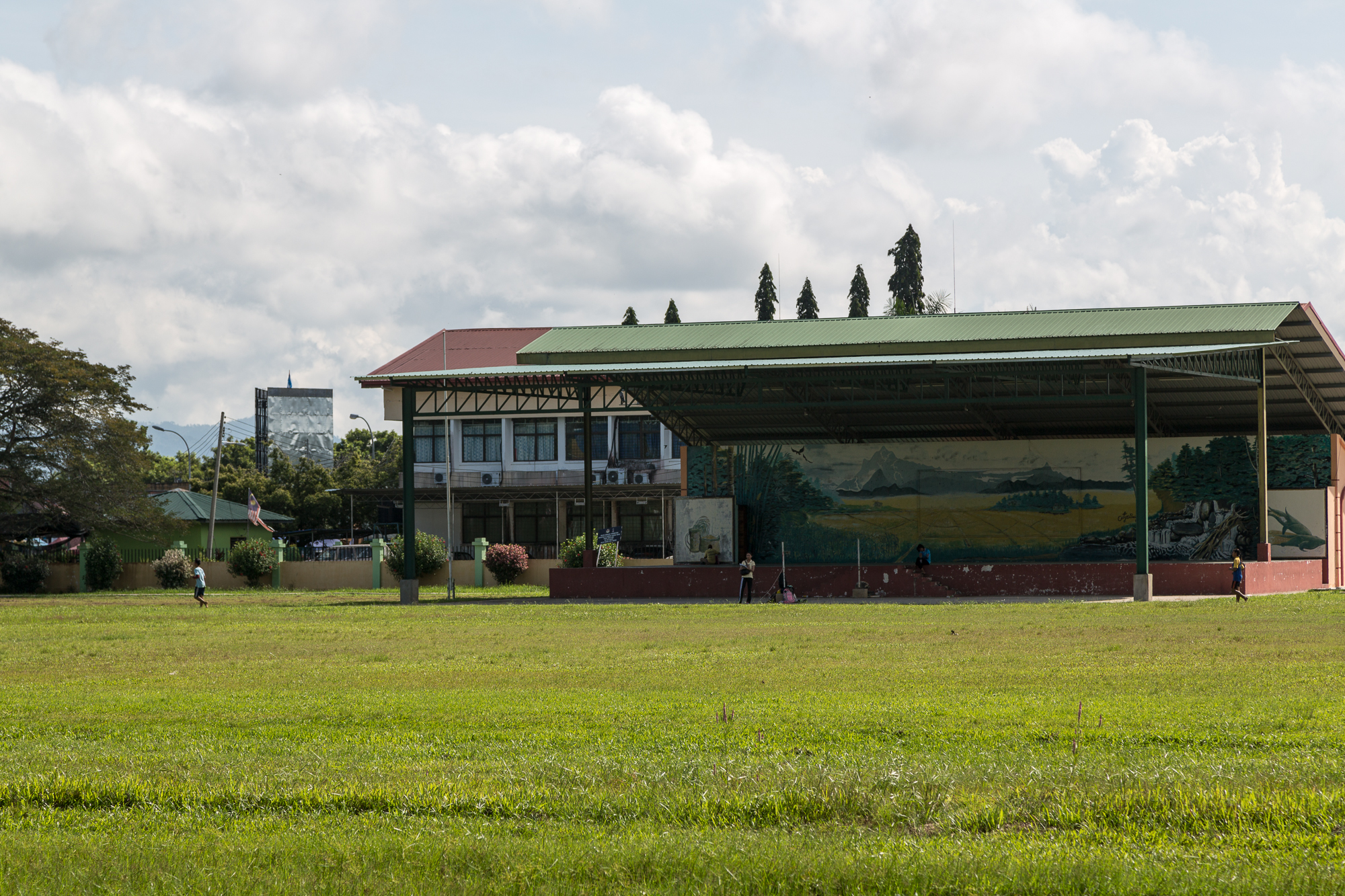
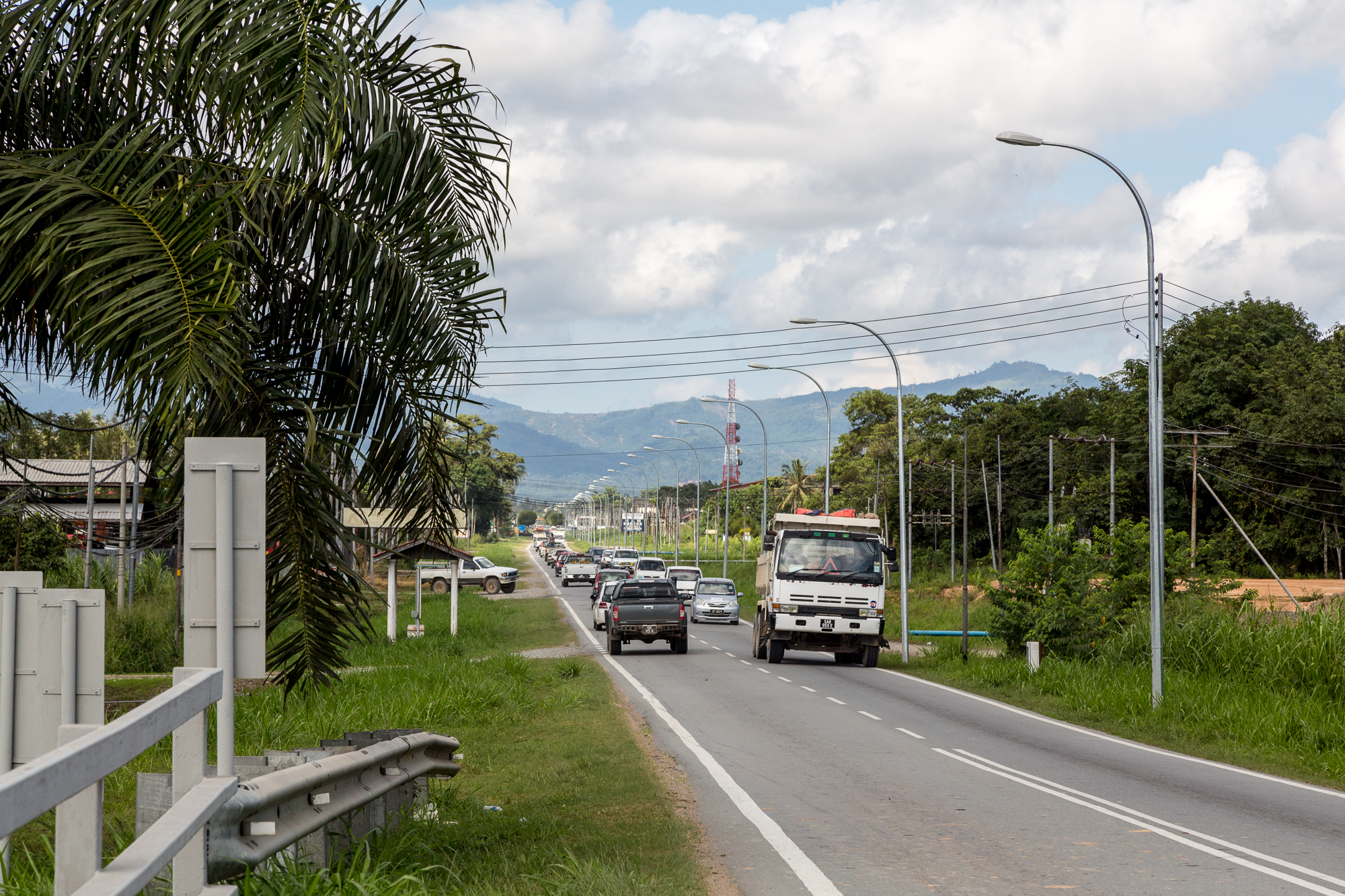
- From top, left to right: Corncob Roundabout in Langkon Commercial Centre, Shophouse in Downtown, the District Office, Town Square, and Access to Town Road

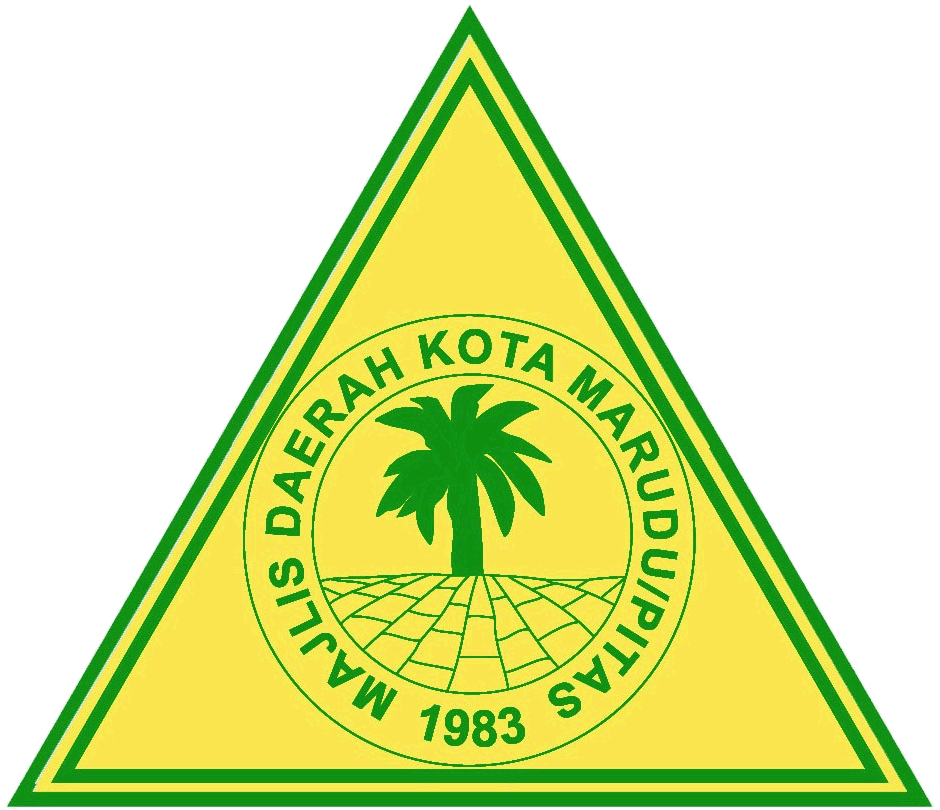
- Seal

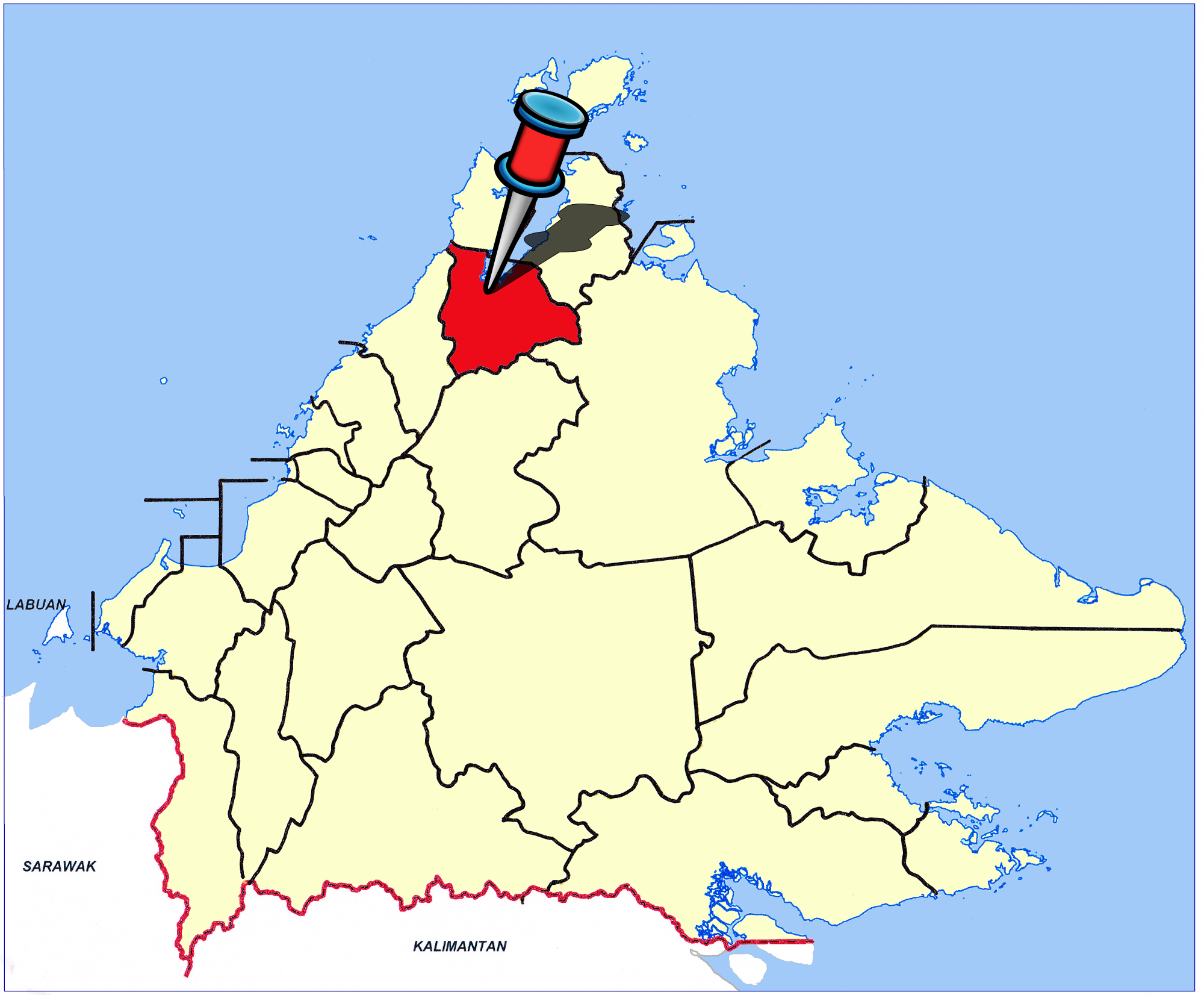
- Coordinates: 6°29′23″N 116°44′10″E
- Country: Malaysia
- State: Sabah
- Division: Kudat
- District: Kota Marudu

Population (2019)
  - Total: 81,300

Kota Marudu (Malay: Pekan Kota Marudu) is the capital of the Kota Marudu District in the Kudat Division of Sabah, Malaysia. Its population was estimated to be around 81,300 in 2019. It is located 130 kilometres north of the state capital, Kota Kinabalu, along the federal highway linking Kota Kinabalu with the town of Kudat, near the northern tip of Borneo.

Places of interest in Kota Marudu include Sorinsim Waterfall, located 40 kilometres from the main town, and Sagabon Park, an agriculture research station on Buyut Lake. Kota Marudu also boasts Southeast Asia's largest solar power station. The town celebrates an annual Maize Festival in honour of the agricultural product's contribution to the district's socio-economic development. The line-up of activities includes a variety of exhibitions, competitions, traditional sports and a beauty pageant.

== History ==
It is not very clear when Kota Marudu was established but it is appeared on the 15th century map of borneo by Johannes Cloppenburgh (circa 1632) and map by Benjamin Wright (1601) with name of "Marudo". It is also referred as "Malloodoo" in other old maps.

== Etymology ==
In some other old maps it is also referred to as Bandau. According to the legend, Bandau is a derivative of the word 'Mondou' from the Rungus dialect which means "the head (leader) of all the beasts". Mondou was once believed to have been founded by Aki Rungsud in the area along the Bandau River. The town was renamed 'Kota Marudu' after a fort (kota) built by local warrior named Sharif Usman at Marudu Bay to protect the area from the British North Borneo colonial authorities, where he was considered by the latter as a pirate.

== Climate ==
Kota Marudu has a tropical rainforest climate (Af) with heavy to very heavy rainfall year-round.

Climate data for Kota Marudu
Month	Jan	Feb	Mar	Apr	May	Jun	Jul	Aug	Sep	Oct	Nov	Dec	Year
Mean daily maximum °C (°F)	29.6 (85.3)	29.8 (85.6)	30.6 (87.1)	31.5 (88.7)	31.9 (89.4)	31.5 (88.7)	31.2 (88.2)	31.3 (88.3)	30.8 (87.4)	30.7 (87.3)	30.4 (86.7)	29.9 (85.8)	30.8 (87.4)
Daily mean °C (°F)	26.1 (79.0)	26.3 (79.3)	26.8 (80.2)	27.5 (81.5)	27.9 (82.2)	27.5 (81.5)	27.2 (81.0)	27.2 (81.0)	26.8 (80.2)	26.9 (80.4)	26.8 (80.2)	26.4 (79.5)	27.0 (80.5)
Mean daily minimum °C (°F)	22.7 (72.9)	22.8 (73.0)	23.1 (73.6)	23.6 (74.5)	23.9 (75.0)	23.5 (74.3)	23.2 (73.8)	23.2 (73.8)	22.9 (73.2)	23.2 (73.8)	23.2 (73.8)	23.0 (73.4)	23.2 (73.8)
Average rainfall mm (inches)	409 (16.1)	233 (9.2)	152 (6.0)	111 (4.4)	174 (6.9)	143 (5.6)	128 (5.0)	107 (4.2)	154 (6.1)	196 (7.7)	228 (9.0)	318 (12.5)	2,353 (92.7)
Source: Climate-Data.org
