= Phlegethon (1840 ship) =

One of six ocean-going iron warships built by the Secret Committee

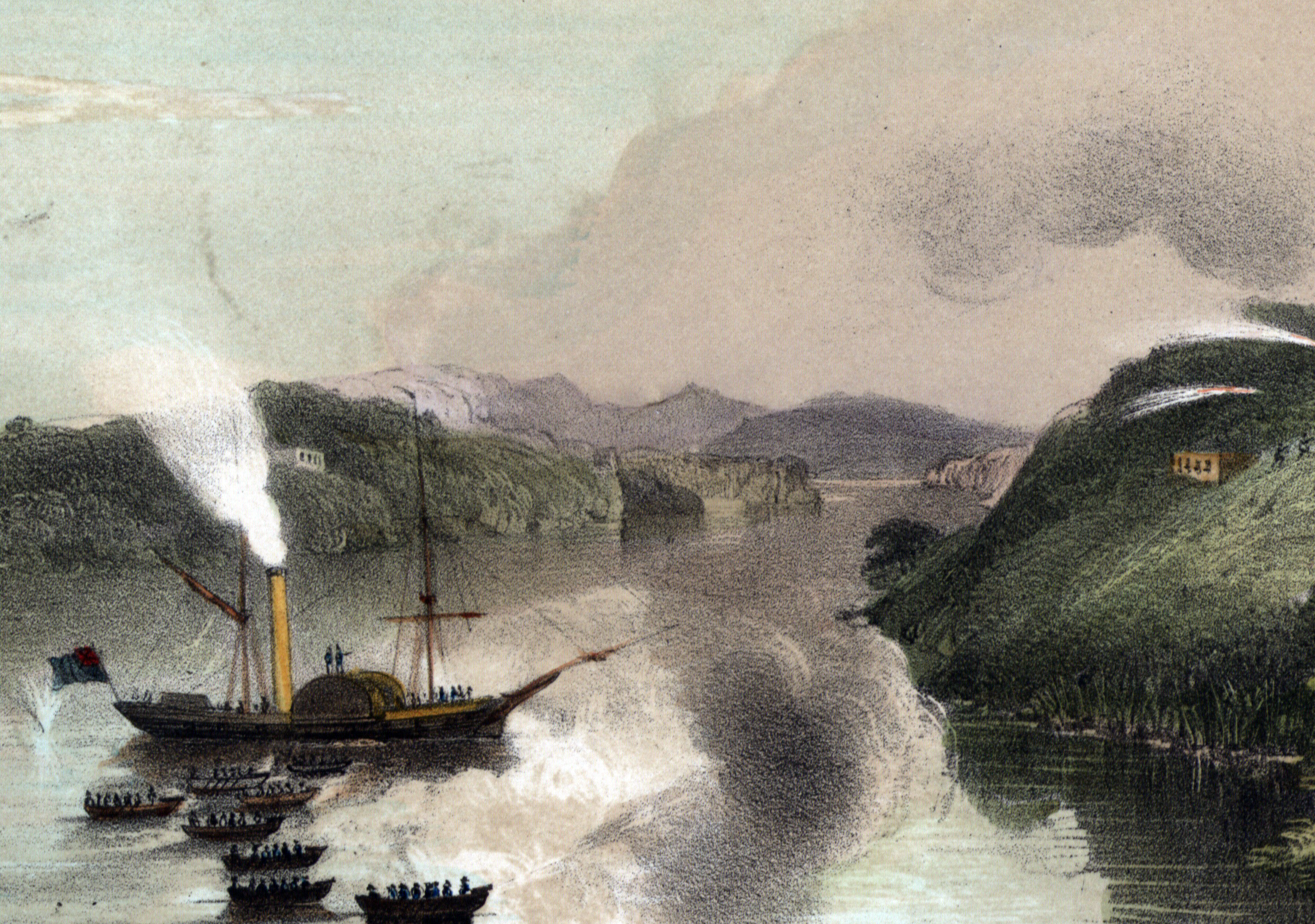
- HEICS Phlegethon attacking Bruneian forts during the capture of Brunei in 1846.

History
- Name: Phlegethon
- Namesake: Phlegethon
- Owner: East India Company
- Builder: Lairds, Birkenhead
- Cost: £24,288
- Launched: 30 April 1840
- Commissioned: 11 Aug 1840
- Fate: Broken up in 1853 at Calcutta

General characteristics
- Class & type: Paddle frigate
- Tons burthen: 530 bm
- Propulsion: 90 hp (67 kW)
- Armament: 4 x 24 pounder brass cannons + 2 x 6 pounder chaser guns, supplemented by Congreve rockets

HEIC Phlegethon was an early iron-hulled paddle steamer built for the East India Company (EIC). Launched in 1840, she was one of the "sliding-keel vessels" commissioned by the EIC's Secret Committee for riverine and coastal warfare. She played a significant role in the First Opium War and later served as a primary instrument of anti-piracy operations in the Straits Settlements and Borneo.

== Design and construction ==
The Phlegethon was ordered as part of a strategic shift toward iron-clad, shallow-draft steamers capable of inland penetration. She was built by Lairds of Birkenhead (Yard No. 27) at a cost of £24,288. Unlike her contemporary, Nemesis, the Phlegethon featured a more sophisticated disconnecting apparatus that allowed the paddle shafts to be disengaged, significantly improving her performance when under sail alone.

== Service history ==
=== Early voyages and the Opium War (1840–1842) ===
Under the command of Captain Richard Francis Cleaveland, Phlegethon departed England on 11 August 1840. Despite encountering severe storms in the Mozambique Passage, her improved longitudinal construction prevented the structural damage that had plagued earlier iron vessels.

By July 1841, the Phlegethon had joined the British fleet in Hong Kong for operations in the First Opium War. On 21 August 1841, she was part of the 36-vessel fleet under Admiral Sir William Parker and Sir Hugh Gough that attacked Amoy. During the campaign, she was frequently used for reconnaissance due to her shallow draft, notably scouting the fortifications at Zhenhai in October 1841.

=== The Fuzhou incident and refit (1843) ===
In early 1843, while anchored off Fuzhou, the Phlegethon struck a submerged object during an ebb tide. The collision tore a 12-by-8-foot (3.7 by 2.4 m) hole in her hull. The vessel was saved only by the rapid sealing of her watertight bulkheads by the captain's steward. She underwent extensive repairs in Calcutta in May 1843.

=== Borneo and anti-piracy operations (1844–1847) ===
In 1844, now under Captain Joseph Scott, the Phlegethon was stationed at Singapore to combat piracy alongside the Diana. In July 1844, she joined Captain Henry Keppel and James Brooke for an expedition to Sarawak.

- Patusan Attack: The Phlegethon towed a flotilla of boats up the Batang Lupar river to attack Syarif Sahib, Syarif Mullah and the Skrang Dayak forts.

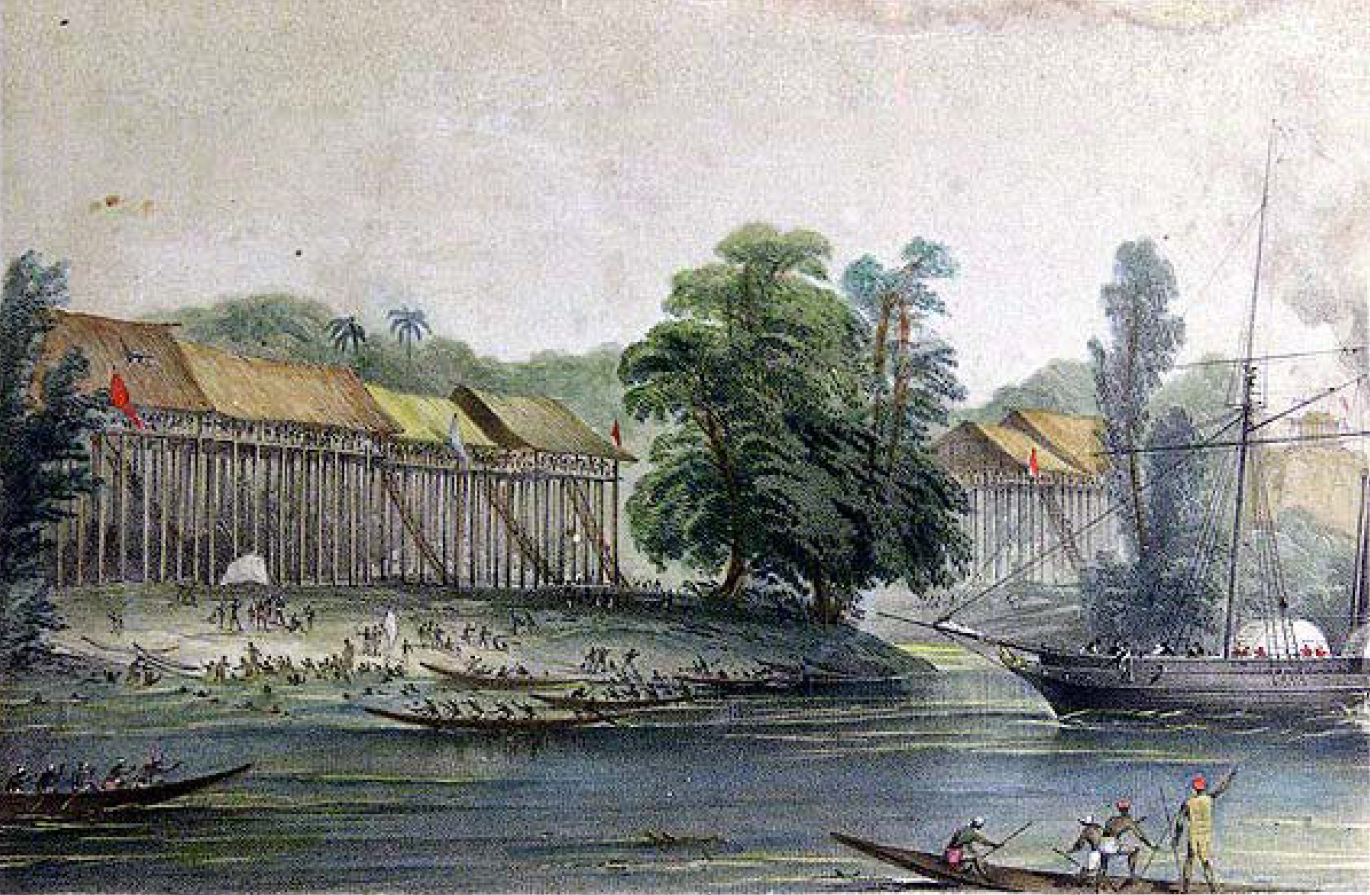
HEICS Phlegethon visiting Kanowit on 29 June 1846

- Brunei Campaign: During the capture of Brunei, 8 July 1846, the vessel suffered a casualty when a 32-pound shot penetrated a paddle box and struck the galley, killing the ship's cook.

=== Final years and decommissioning (1851–1853) ===
Phlegethon remained in Chinese waters under Captain Niblett until 1851, after which she was deployed to Moulmein and later Rangoon for the Second Anglo-Burmese War. In January 1852, she participated in the bombardment of Burmese fortifications under orders from Commodore George Lambert.

By 1853, the vessel's condition had deteriorated significantly. Under Acting Commander T. H. Hodge, she was found to be structurally unsound and was towed to Calcutta by the Fire Queen.

== Fate ==
Following a survey at Calcutta in late 1853, Phlegethon was condemned. She was dismantled over the following months; her engines and hull were deemed of such little value that they were not salvaged for future vessels, marking the end of her thirteen-year service career.
