= Apostate War =

Conflict in the Philippines and Borneo

Date	1769 – 1790 (21 years)
Location	Borneo; Philippines
Result	Bruneian victory: Pirate activity ends in 1830 (Note: Started from 1770)

Belligerents
Bruneian Empire	Sulu Sultanate (Note: Originally under British influence before the actual start of the war); Kingdom of Spain (1769); Captaincy General of the Philippines (1769)

Commanders and leaders
Omar Ali Saifuddien I # Muhammad Tajuddin; Awang Aliwaddin; Pengiran Temenggong Ampa; Embo Ali; Raja Tua of Mengkabong (Note: "Raja Tua" is a title, not a name.)	Ferdinand I # (Note: Ferdinand I's Muslim name is Azim ud-Din I); Muhammad Israil (executed); Azim ud-Din II; Datu Teting (surrendered); Charles III # José Antonio Raón y Gutiérrez

Units involved
Bruneian Army; Bruneian Navy	Sulu Army; Moro pirates; Spanish Army; Spanish garrison in Manila

Strength
above ~12,000+ warriors.; 2,000 Sama-Bajau	estimated 8,000 estimated 4,000 men

Casualties and losses
estimated 4,000	estimated 6,000+

The Apostate War (Tausug; Parrang Murtad, Malay: ڤراڠ مرتد, romanized: Perang Murtad) also called the Bruneian-Sulu War was a conflict between the Sulu Sultanate and the Bruneian Empire. Brunei also fought Spain briefly as well

This war was also the first time Brunei ever used flintlock muskets, as they began acquiring them in the late 17th century and early 18th century

== Background ==
The Sultan of Sulu was instated by the British to control Manila in 1763. Sultan Omar Ali Saifuddin who learned about the situation in Manila, he was displeased as Azim ud-Din I was a apostate. As a result, he commanded an attack on the Sulu Sultanate in Manila with his forces under the command of Pehin Orang Kaya Di-Gadong Seri Lela Awang Aliwaddin.

== War ==
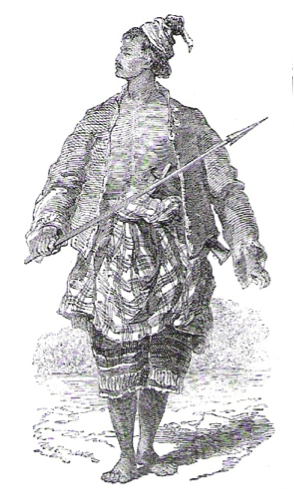
A Bruneian warrior in the 18th century

The mission did not arrive in Manila until 1769 because the expedition's preparations took so long. Sultan Azim ud-Din I (Alimuddin) had already departed Manila for Sulu in 1764 after the Treaty of Paris, therefore Manila was under Spanish rule when the siege began. The siege was successful for Brunei, capturing it in the process.

The Sulu Sultanate then dispatched a force under the command of Datu Teting to attack Balambangan in 1775 while the leaders of Balambangan sought safety in Labuan after the British quickly established a presence in Brunei. When the two forces clashed, Datu Teting surrendered and his troops fled back to Sulu after learning that the warriors of Brunei, led by Pengiran Temenggong Ampa, were far too strong for them to defeat.

In 1788, a Sulu army attacked many coastal villages around Sabah as an attempt to invade Brunei, led by Datu Teting who previously burned Balambangan before retreating, arriving at Kampung Sembulan in said year. In Kinarut, they were defeated by Illanun warriors from Marudu, Mengkabong, Tempasuk and Abai who likely defected to Brunei and were commanded by Malay chiefs from said places. They later advanced to Sembulan expecting to meet the Sulu army again at said place.

They were later defeated by again Pengiran Temenggong Ampa, Sharif Amir and Raja Tua of Mengkabong (in today's Tuaran District, Sabah, Malaysia). The Bruneians numbered more than 5,000 soldiers, 2,000 were Sama-Bajau, Johor seafarers and Illanun warriors who previously fought in the battle of Kinarut and defeated the Sulu army, called the "Mundu army", which were made up of Banguingui warriors.

== Aftermath ==
After defeating the Sulu, a Hulubalang who fought in the battle of Sembulan, Embo Ali alternatively known as Embo Amirullah became the official caretaker of Kampung Sembulan and stayed connected with Brunei until 1790.

His descendents would continue to fight in Marudu, Gaya and Pandasan, later hiding as fishermen, learning the Bajau and Kadazan-Dusun languages, to fully escape detection by British authorities.

While piracy continued after the war, which would officially end in the aftermath of the battle off Mukkah.
