= Sharif Uthman =

Rajah of Marudu

Sharif Uthman شريف عثمان
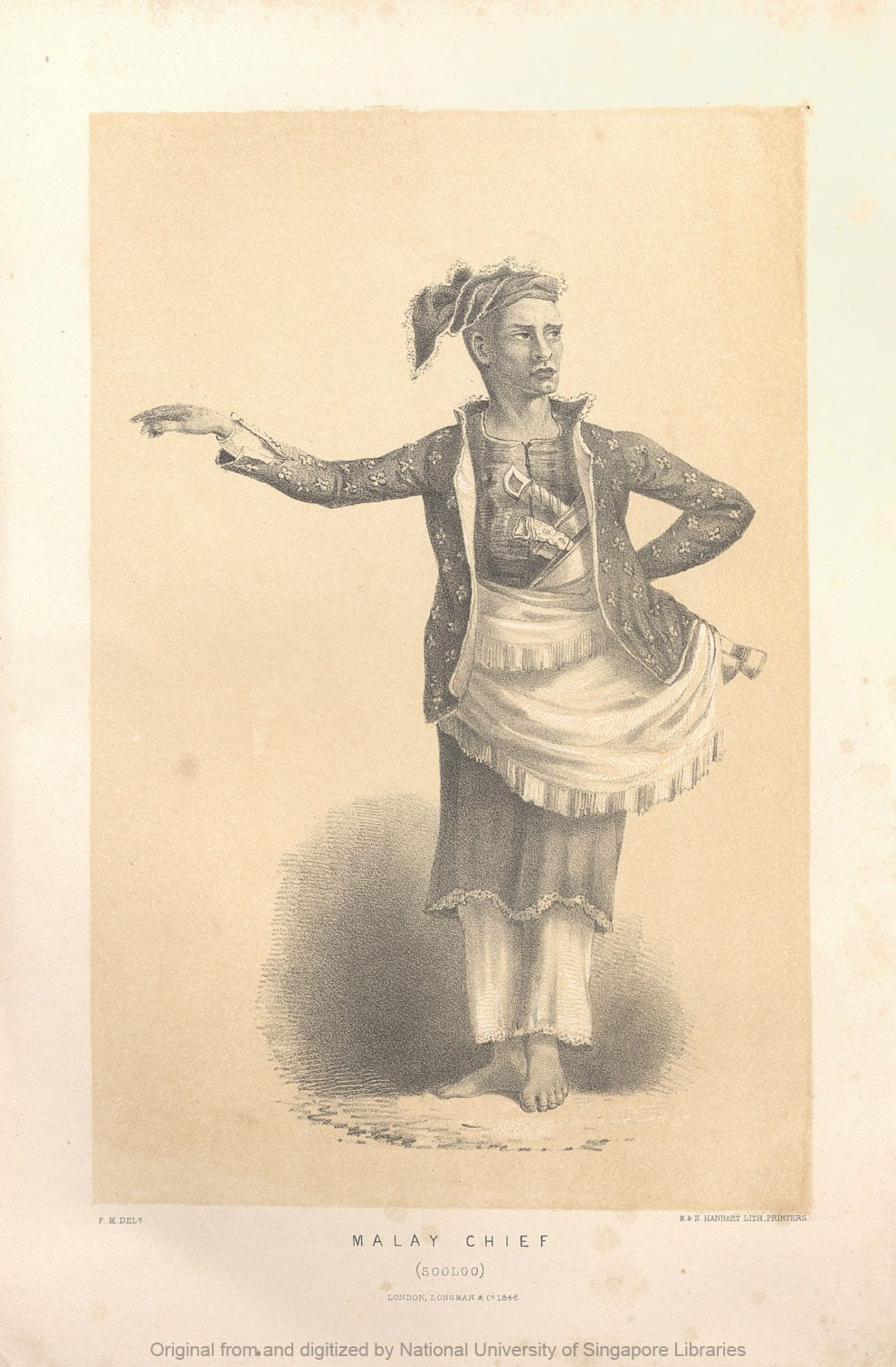
- A Sulu chief, possibly Sharif Uthman
- Reign: 1830–1846
- Successor: Sharif Yassin (1845–1882); Sharif Hassan (co-king)
- Born: likely around 1810
- Died: 1846 (disputed)
- Spouse: Dayang Cahaya
- Issue: Sharif Yassin; Sharif Hassan; Sharifa Loya
- House: House of Osman
- Mother: a local Bajau woman
- Religion: Sunni Islam

Sharif Uthman (Note: His name is also spelled as Sharif Osman, Sharif Usman and Syarif Osman) or referred to as "Rajah of Maloodoo" by Governor Butterworth of Singapore (missing in action c. 1845) was the first and last independent Rajah of Marudu from 1830 until 1845. He would be succeeded by his sons, Sharif Yassin and Sharif Hassan though they couldn't regain their father's influence. He is one of many heroes of Sabah.

== Early life ==
He was of mixed Suluk-Bajau and Bruneian Sharif descent. He was married to a Sulu princess who was the niece of the Sultan of Sulu, Sultan Jamalul ul-Azam, named Dayang Cahaya. Sharif Uthman was appointed by the Sultan of Sulu to rule and collect taxes in Marudu when the area was handed over by Omar Ali Saifuddin II to the Jamalul Kiram I.

== Reign ==
After becoming the governor of Marudu, he transformed Marudu into a kerajaan, leaving his protectorate status from the Sulu Sultanate. He had strong influence on Eastern Sabah, making alliances amongst other Sabahan princes. British attempts to drive the Sultan of Sulu's followers out of the region failed. And a punitive expedition by the "White Rajah" James Brooke in 1845 with the defaming reason of Marudu being a base of operations for pirates.

In the Bay of Marudu Uthman owned a fortress on the Langkon River. It was well armed and could be well defended. There was a large barrier made of tree trunks and iron chains in the river, preventing attackers going further on. Its flag was red and showed a tiger's head.

After he fired a cannon shot at the British at Kota Marudu, battle ensued, the British were exposed to cannon fire for about an hour. Of the six to eight British dead and about twenty wounded, most fell during this initial exchange of fire. It is unclear whether Uthman's men fired at any significant volume afterward. Stephen Evans attributed the relatively rapid end of the battle to an operator's error by the fortress gunners

Abbas/Bali explained Uthman's defeat as treason and underestimation of the naval gunfire, as Uthman had not expected the guns to reach his fortress. The interpretation that Uthman lost the battle due to the enemy's superior force may be the most accurate. Shortly after the initial exchange of fire, Talbot landed some of his men on the right bank and aimed rockets at the fortress likely using Congreve rockets. The rocket landed on the right bank and fired with good effect into the stockade.

Sharif Uthman likely didn't expect the British to have weapons with such a range at their disposal. The rockets caused devastating damage to the fortress. Nevertheless, the defenders tried to use the still-functioning cannons to prevent the British from breaking through the fortifications. The persistent bombardment and defense of the barrier may have been Uthman's only real chance to prevent the storming of his fortress and city. What Rutter described as the devil-may-care spirit of Uthman's men was more likely an expression of a desperate defense. When the British finally broke through the barrier, some hand-to-hand combat still took place, but most of the defenders probably had no doubt that the battle was finally decided. They fled, even though they might have had the best chance against the numerically inferior British in close combat. Perhaps the loss of skilled warriors due to the rocket fire was too great for an effective defense.

== Death or wounded? ==
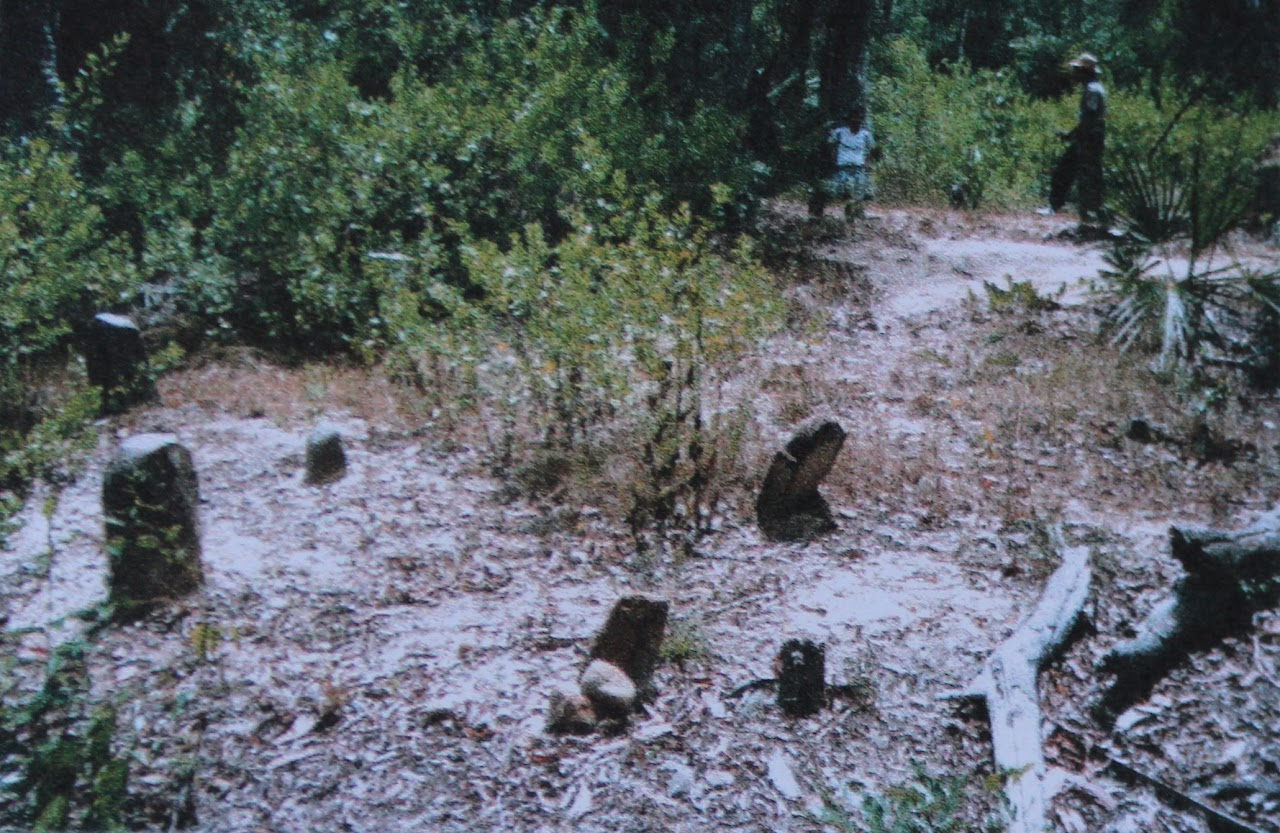
Cemetery on the grounds of Sharif Uthman's fortress

Whether Sharif Uthman himself was killed during the battle is not clear from the eyewitness accounts. He was presumably wounded and carried off. Talbot made no mention of Uthman's fate in his report. Cochrane reported that he was wounded, but did not know whether he was dead or alive. In a later letter to the Admiralty, Cochrane gave the impression that he assumed Sharif survived; he triumphantly stated:

"And as I believe, I have left him [Osman] with nothing but the clothes he wore, and a small house in the country to which I understand he sent his wives and children the evening before the attack, he has no means of recommencing his piratical proceedings!"

— Cochrane

Cree presumed that Uthman had been wounded. Brooke, too, was unsure whether Uthman was dead a day after the battle. In the Journal Mundy, he initially reported that Uthman had been driven into the mountains. The newspaper Friend of China reported on September 17, 1845, that at the time of the report, ten Europeans and 30 men from Manila were still in Uthman's captivity as slaves. All these reports call into question the later frequently and persistently repeated statement that Uthman succumbed to his wound in the neck. The British found several Sharifs and leaders among the dead in the fortress area, but Sharif Uthman was not discovered.

Wright assumes that Uthman fled to Tungku to join his friend Raja Laut. Some authors point out that Uthman's followers fled to Tungku after the battle. Baring-Gould/Bampfylde, however, argue that in 1846 some Iranun retreated from the towns of Tempasuk and Pindusan, destroyed by Captain Mundy, to Tungku to continue their piratical activities, but the Marudu survivors settled on Palawan and in Bongon (Marudu Bay) and were therefore not directly pirates.

== Legacy ==
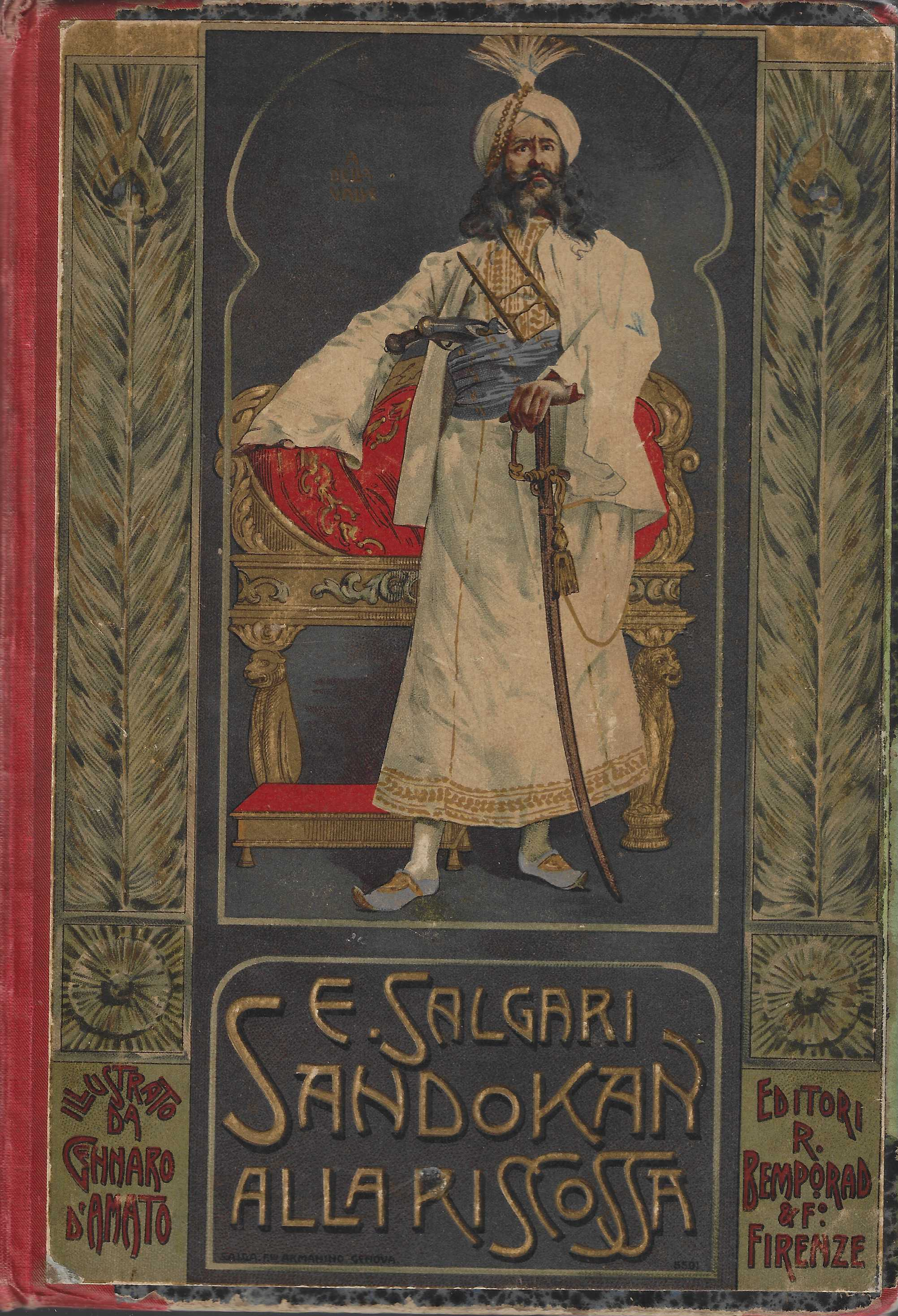
Sandokan, a fictional character inspired by Sharif Uthman

After being missing in action, his sons took over, his son Sharif Hassan resided in the south of Marudu Bay but had conflicts with other leaders and was even expelled temporarily. Another son, Sharif Yassin, fought in the Battle of Marudu and fled temporarily to Sugut. He was perceived as Raja when residing in Benggaya in 1851, and was a principal chief of the Bay of Marudu in 1879 by the British. Sharif Yassin and, after Yassin’s death, his son Sharif Hussin resided on the eastern side of Marudu Bay, and Yassin’s sister Sharifa Loya was chief of Kalimo village on the Bongon River.

Sharif Uthman would be one of the inspiration for Sandokan, a fictional character made by Italian author Emilio Salgari. The other inspiration being the Spanish naval captain Carlos Cuarteroni Fernández.

We know Sandokan is based on Sharif Uthman, as Sandokan also used the flag of Marudu which was a tiger's head on a red background. And also the fact that one of the main enemies of Sandokan being James Brooke, who was also the main opponent of the historical Sharif Uthman.
