= Marudu Bay =

Bay on the northern coast of Borneo

- Malay: Teluk Marudu
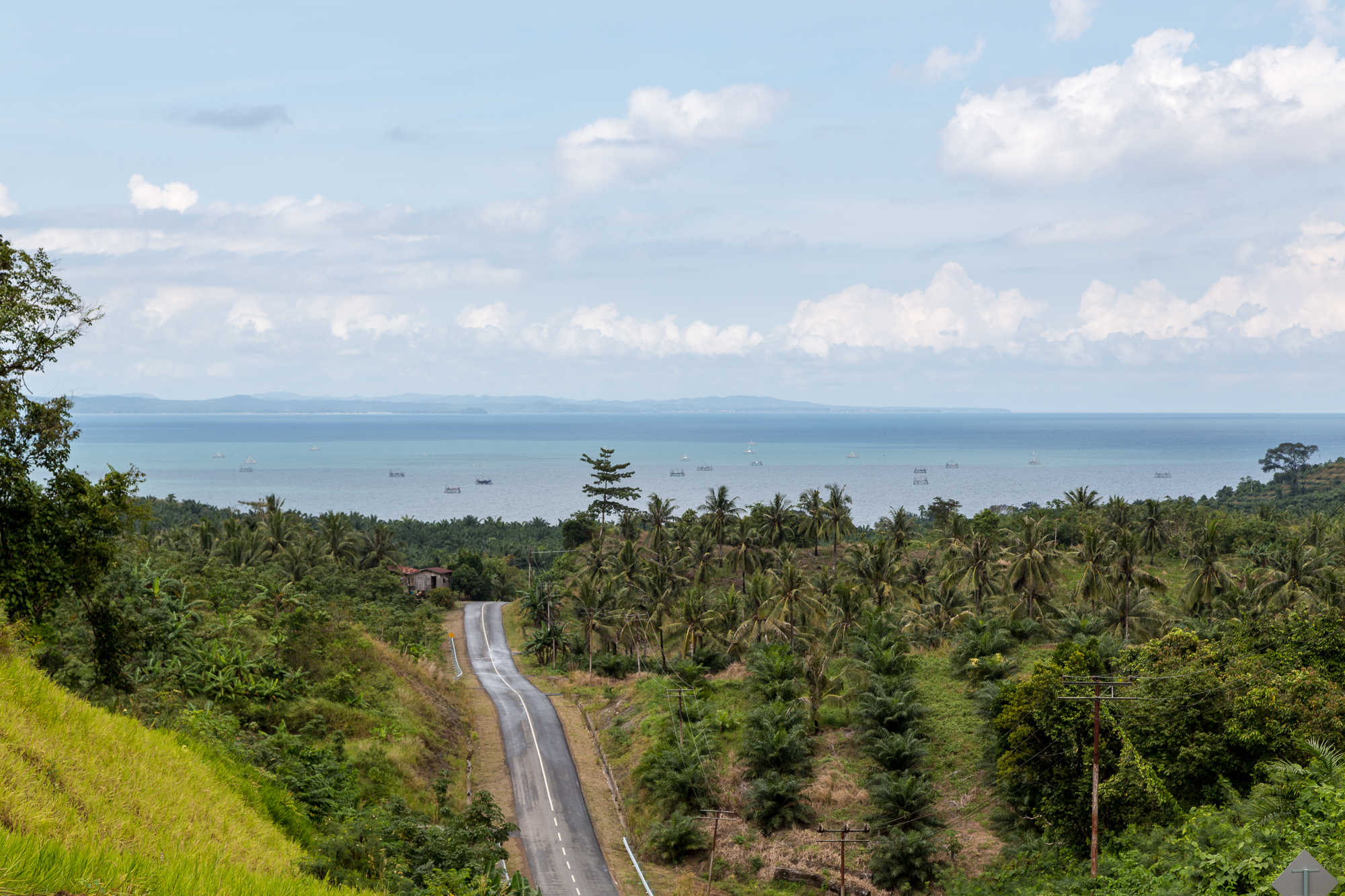
- Marudu Bay, seen from the east side at Kg. Mempakad.

- Location within Malaysia Marudu Bay (Malaysia)
- Location: Kudat Division, Sabah, Malaysia
- Coordinates: 6°58′0″N 116°56′0″E
- Type: Bay
- Part of: Sulu Sea
- River sources: Bandau River (Marudu River), Bintasan River, Telaga River, Taka River, Taritipan River, Tuaran River, Kinarom River
- Max. length: 60 kilometres (37 mi)
- Max. width: 15 kilometres (9.3 mi)
- Surface area: 1,000 square kilometres (390 sq mi)
- Average depth: 33 metres (108 ft)
- Settlements: Kudat, Kota Marudu

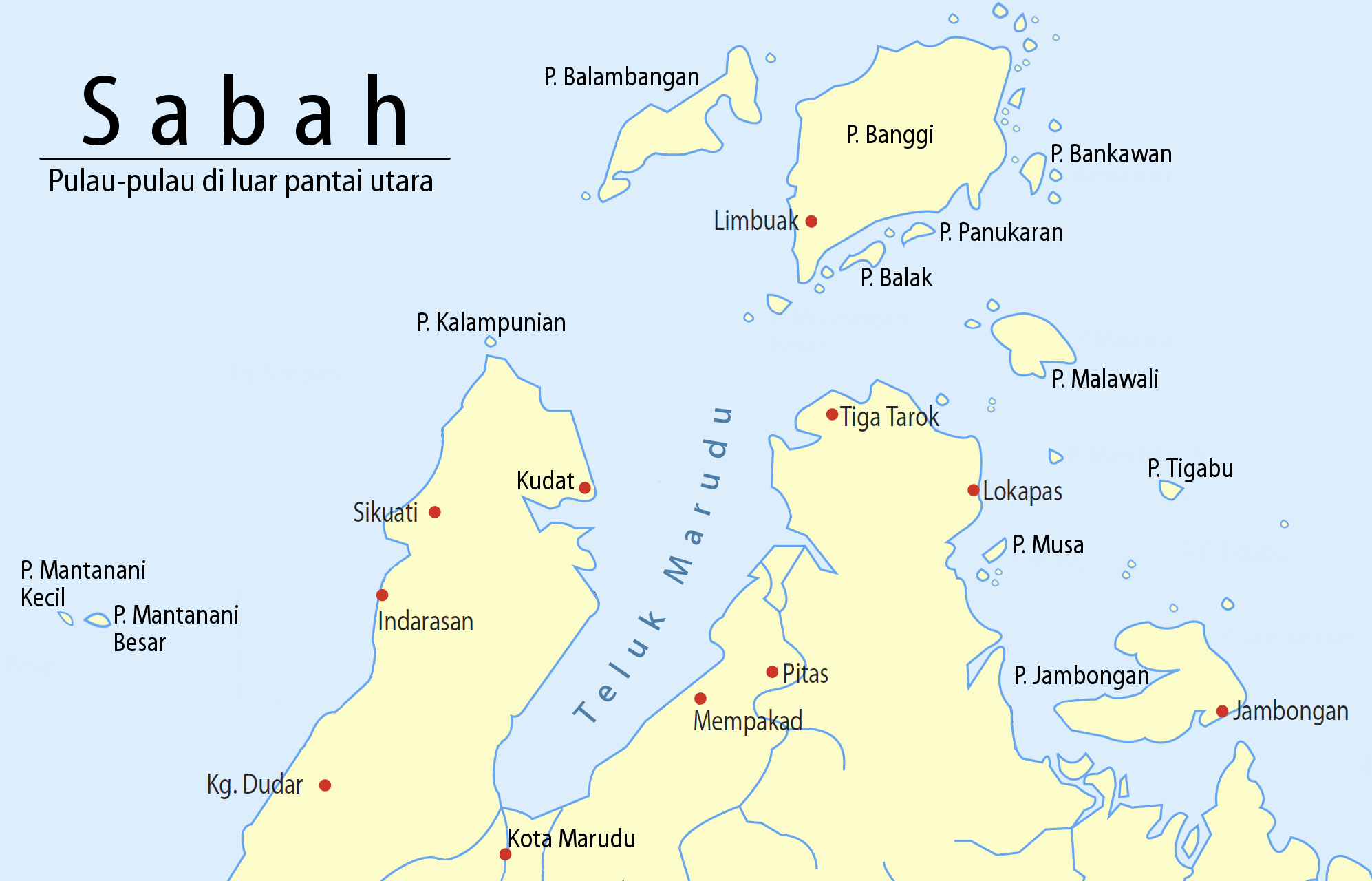
Location of Marudu Bay on the north coast of Sabah

Marudu Bay (Malay: Teluk Marudu) is a large bay on the north coast of the island of Borneo. It is located in the state of Sabah, Malaysia and opens to the Sulu Sea. Administratively, it is a part of Kudat Division. Kota Marudu District is on the south side of the bay, Kudat District on the west and Pitas District on the east side.

== Geography ==
The bay covers an area of approximately 1000 km^{2}. Mangrove swamps are mainly found at the southern end of the bay around Kota Marudu.

== History ==
Marudu Bay had been in the overlapping spheres of interest of the Sultanate of Sulu and Bruneian Sultanate since the 18th century. Attempts to drive the Sultan of Sulu's followers out of the region failed. A punitive expedition by the "White Rajah" James Brooke in 1845 only succeeded in weakening the power of the Sultanate of Sulu in the region for a short time, despite naval support from Sir Thomas Cochrane. Although Sharif Usman, the Sultan's governor, was killed in this punitive expedition, his son Sharif Yassin returned to Marudu Bay in 1870 and founded a trading post at the mouth of Tandik River.

Shortly after his appointment, William Hood Treacher, the first governor of North Borneo under the North Borneo Chartered Company, moved the company's headquarters to a small bay in Marudu Bay that had just been discovered by Alfred Hart Everett. It was here in Kudat where North Borneo's first capital was located for two short years.

In 1887, Count Geldes d'Elslov acquired extensive areas of land on Marudu Bay and began growing tobacco. From these beginnings emerged the London Borneo Tobacco Company.

In 1892, the Filipino national hero José Rizal, together with like-minded people, planned to found an agricultural settlement at the mouth of Bengkoka River in Marudu Bay in order to escape the repression of the Spanish government. However, the idea of a patriotic enclave was never realized.

== British Borneo Exploration Syndicate Company Limited ==
In 1904, the British Borneo Exploration Syndicate Company Limited acquired the monopoly to exploit the mineral resources in the Marudu Bay area and began mining manganese. The company constructed a wharf, offices, and a 22-mile metre-gauge railway from the bay to the deposits. However, poor management resulted in the first (and only) ship's load of manganese being dumped overboard upon arrival in England as it turned out to be low-quality shale with low manganese content.

The company returned its mining rights to the Chartered Company in 1913. The narrow-gauge railway was dismantled. The route later served as a route to the rubber plantation of the Taritipan Rubber Estate, which had acquired the former mine site. The two locomotives became the property of the North Borneo Railway (now known as Sabah State Railway). The locomotive "Biliajong", built in 1905, was scrapped before 1914. The "Marudu" locomotive was used at Jesselton and survived both world wars. She was scrapped in 1954.

== Literature ==
- K. G. Tregonning: A History Of Modern Sabah (North Borneo 1881–1963). 2nd edition. University of Malaya Press, Kuala Lumpur 1965, Reprint 1967.
