= Rodney Mundy =

Royal Navy Admiral of the Fleet (1805–1884)

Admiral of the Fleet Sir Rodney Mundy GCB
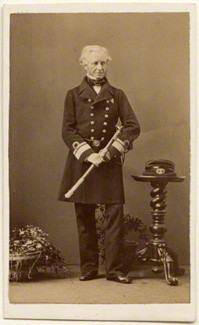
- Sir Rodney Mundy
- Born: 19 April 1805; London
- Died: 23 December 1884 (aged 79); London
- Military career
- Allegiance: United Kingdom
- Branch: Royal Navy
- Service years: 1818–75
- Rank: Admiral of the Fleet
- Commands: HMS Favourite; HMS Iris; HMS Nile; North America and West Indies Station; Portsmouth Command
- Conflicts: Belgian Revolution; Anglo-Bruneian War; Crimean War
- Awards: Knight Grand Cross of the Order of the Bath

Admiral of the Fleet Sir George Rodney Mundy, GCB (19 April 1805 – 23 December 1884) was a Royal Navy officer. As a commander, he persuaded the Dutch to surrender Antwerp during the Belgian Revolution and then acted as a mediator during negotiations between the Dutch and the Belgians to end hostilities. As a captain, he was deployed to the East Indies Station and was asked to keep the Sultan of Brunei in line until the British Government made a final decision on whether to take the island of Labuan: he took the Sultan's son-in-law, Pengiran Mumin, to witness the island's accession to the British Crown in December 1846. He was then deployed to the seas of Finland, where he secured Björkö Sound in operations against Russia during the Crimean War.

Mundy became Second-in-Command of the Mediterranean Fleet and, in May 1860, in the Expedition of the Thousand, was present in Palermo, Sicily when Giuseppe Garibaldi, the Italian general and politician, led his volunteers into the city. Mundy went on to be Commander-in-Chief, North America and West Indies Station and then Commander-in-Chief, Portsmouth.

== Early career ==
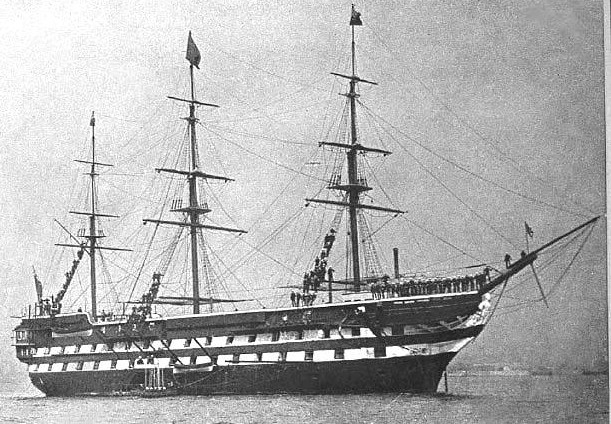
The second-rate HMS Nile in which Mundy secured Björkö Sound in operations against Russia during the Crimean War

Born the son of General Godfrey Basil Mundy and Sarah Bridges (daughter of George Brydges Rodney, 1st Baron Rodney), Mundy joined the Royal Naval College, Portsmouth as a cadet in February 1818. He was appointed as a volunteer to the fifth-rate HMS Phaeton on the North America and West Indies Station in December 1819 and, having been promoted to midshipman, he transferred to the frigate HMS Euryalus in the Mediterranean Fleet in 1822. After a brief tour in the third-rate HMS Rochfort also in the Mediterranean Fleet, he transferred to the South American Station in April 1824 and then served successively in the fifth-rate HMS Blanche, the sloop HMS Jaseur, the third-rate HMS Wellesley and finally the second-rate HMS Cambridge. Promoted to lieutenant on 4 February 1826, he joined the sloop HMS Eclair on the South American Station in July 1826. He then transferred to the sixth-rate HMS Challenger in February 1828 off Lisbon before moving to the fifth-rate HMS Pyramus also off Lisbon only a few months later.

Promoted to commander on 25 August 1828, Mundy joined the third-rate HMS Donegal and served as a liaison officer tasked to persuade the Dutch to surrender Antwerp during the Belgian Revolution. He then acted as a mediator during negotiations between the Dutch and the Belgians to end hostilities in May 1833. He became commanding officer of the sloop HMS Favourite in the Mediterranean Fleet in August 1833.

Promoted to captain on 10 January 1837, he became commanding officer of the sixth-rate HMS Iris in the West Africa Squadron in October 1842. He was then re-deployed with HMS Iris to the East Indies Station and was involved in operations under Admiral Sir Thomas Cochrane. Mundy was asked to keep the Sultan of Brunei in line until the British Government made a final decision on whether to take the island of Labuan: he took the Sultan's son-in-law, Pengiran Mumin, to witness the island's accession to the British Crown on 24 December 1846. Some sources state that during the signing of the treaty, the Sultan had been threatened by a British navy warship ready to fire on the Sultan's palace if he refused to sign the treaty while another source says the island was ceded to Britain as a reward for assistance in combating pirates.

Mundy became commanding officer of the second-rate HMS Nile in July 1854 and was deployed, in Spring 1855, to the Baltic Sea and then, in September 1855, to the seas of Finland where he secured Björkö Sound in operations against Russia during the Crimean War.

== Senior command ==
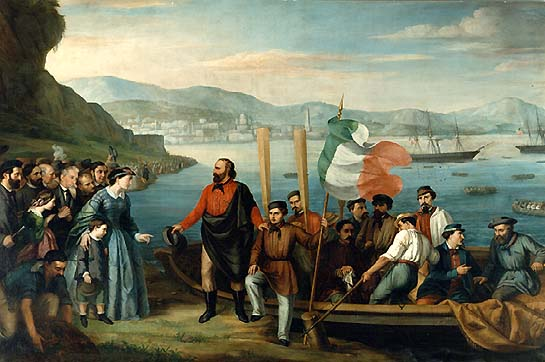
Giuseppe Garibaldi setting off at the start of the Expedition of the Thousand

Promoted to rear admiral on 30 July 1857, Mundy became Second-in-Command of the Mediterranean Fleet, with his flag in the second-rate HMS Hannibal in April 1859. He was appointed a Companion of the Order of the Bath on 23 June 1859. In May 1860, in the Expedition of the Thousand, he was involved in evacuating local citizens from the conflict. Garibaldi went on to depose Francis II, the tyrannical ruler of the Kingdom of the Two Sicilies in March 1861, and to achieve Italian unification. Garibaldi credited Mundy with bringing about the armistice between the warring parties and offered him his heartfelt gratitude "in the name of Palermo, of Sicily, of entire Italy."

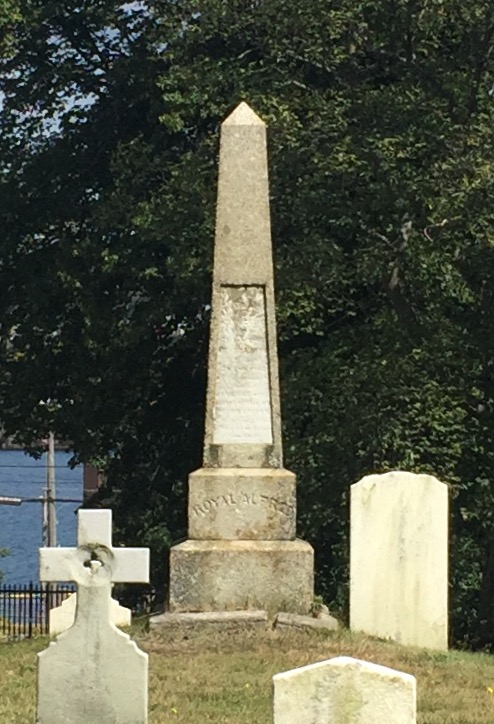
Monument erected by Mundy to the crew of HMS Royal Albert that died at Halifax, Royal Navy Burying Ground (Halifax, Nova Scotia)

Mundy went on to be Commander of detached squadron on the Syrian coast in 1861 and, having been advanced to Knight Commander of the Order of the Bath on 10 November 1862, he was promoted to vice-admiral on 15 December 1863. He then became Commander in-Chief, North America and West Indies Station, with his flag in the broadside ironclad HMS Royal Alfred, in January 1867. Promoted to full admiral on 26 May 1869, he became Commander-in-Chief, Portsmouth in March 1872 and retired in April 1875.

Mundy was advanced to Knight Grand Cross of the Order of the Bath on 2 June 1877 and, having been promoted to Admiral of the Fleet on 27 December 1877, he died at his home in Chesterfield Street, London on 23 December 1884.

== Family ==
Mundy never married and had no children.

== See also ==
- O'Byrne, William Richard (1849). "Mundy, George Rodney" . A Naval Biographical Dictionary . John Murray – via Wikisource.

== Sources ==
- Garibaldi, Giuseppe (1889). Autobiography of Giuseppe Garibaldi, Volume 3. Walter Smith & Innies.
- Heathcote, Tony (2002). The British Admirals of the Fleet 1734–1995. Pen & Sword. ISBN 0-85052-835-6.
- Saunders, Graham (2013). A History of Brunei. Routledge. ISBN 978-1-136-87394-2.

Military offices
Preceded by Sir James Hope	Commander-in-Chief, North America and West Indies Station; 1867–1869	Succeeded by Sir George Wellesley
Preceded by Sir James Hope	Commander-in-Chief, Portsmouth; 1872–1875	Succeeded by Sir George Elliot
