= Military of the Bruneian Sultanate =

Army of the Bruneian Sultanate

- Tentera Kesultanan Brunei (Malay) (Note: تنترا كسلطانن بروني (Jawi))
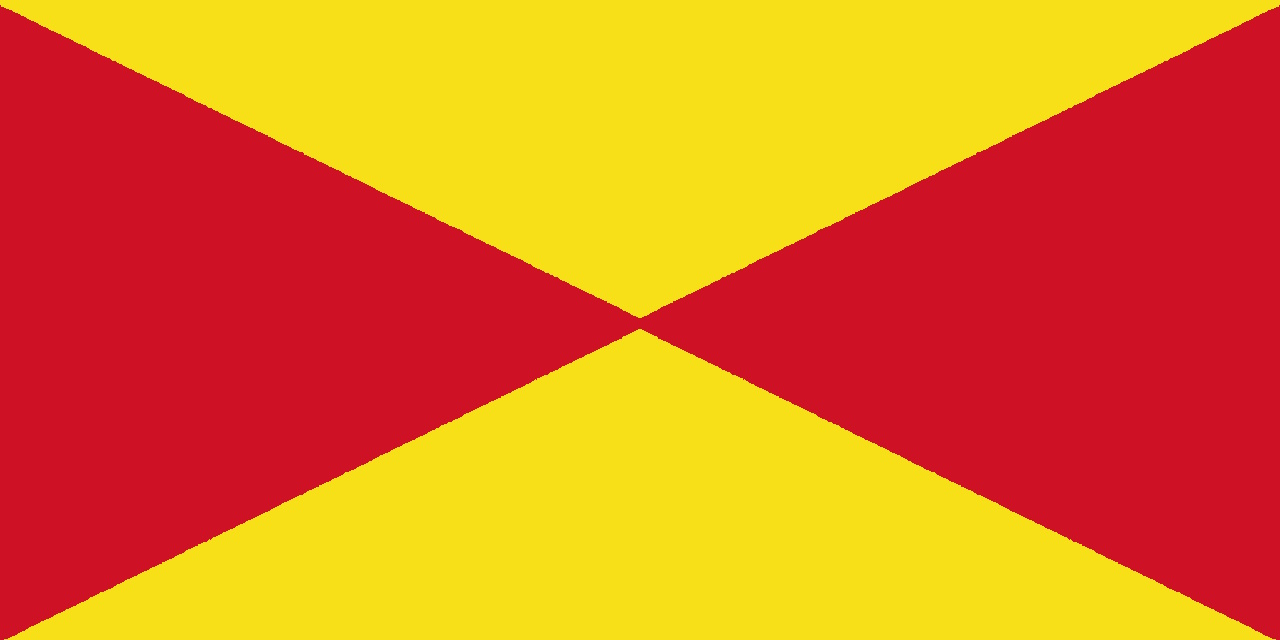
- Right: Main flag Left: War flag
- Active: 1368–1888
- Disbanded: 1888 (de jure); 1906 (de facto) (Note: Minor involvement via Simbulan in 1915)
- Country: Bruneian Sultanate / British Protectorate of Brunei (1888–1906)
- Allegiance: Sultan of Brunei; Queen Victoria (1888–1901); King Edward VII (1901–1906)
- Type: army
- Role: Military force (until 1888; 1906); (Note: Minor involvement via Simbulan in 1915)
- Size: >300 soldiers
- Mottos: ملايو اسلام براجا; Melayu Islam Beraja; Malay, Islam, Monarchy (1425–1888)
- Colours: Yellow
- Engagements: Bruneian Sultanate: Early Bruneian conquests Tondo War; Castilian War; Bruneian Civil War of 1660; Apostate War; Melanau Rebellion of 1795; Pacification of Lanun; Bruneian Civil War of 1826; Sarawak Uprising of 1836; Anglo-Bruneian War; Langkon War; Limbang Rebellion of 1884; Padas Damit War; Belait Rebellion
- Battle honours: War spoils

Commanders
- De jure leader: Sultans of Brunei (1363–1888); Monarchs of the United Kingdom (1888–1906)
- De facto leader: Wazirs; British residents (1888–1906)
- Notable commanders: Bendahara Sakam; Abdul Hakkul Mubin; Muhyiddin of Brunei; Bolkiah; Awang Jerambak

The Military of the Bruneian Sultanate (Malay: تنتيرا كسلطانن بروني, romanized: Tentera Kesultanan Brunei) was the land force of the Bruneian Sultanate from 1368 to 1906.

== History ==
=== Early history (1363–1408) ===
The first battle between Brunei and foreign armies was the Sarawakian Igan Valley. The Igan River flowed through this valley and was located in the traditional lands of the Melanau-speaking people. There are two accounts of the fight: the first, more legendary, tells of a nine-month struggle between three Brunei heroes and Bilanapura, a genie that Jerambak finally defeated using a miraculous fish skin he stole from an ogre. According to the second, Awang Jerambak's Brunei men came up against Basiung and his nine thousand-strong allied armies from Sambas, Matu, Sadung, and Sarikei. The Brunei army, aided by the Iban, overpowered Basiung's warriors despite their superior numbers; as a result, Igan was destroyed and war spoils were taken. Following this, Jerambak made Igan accept Awang Alak Betatar's dominance.

The Bruneian soldiers persisted in their conquests, subduing Igan's allies, such as Sarikei, Rajang, Sadung, Sarawak, Tanjung Datu, and Lingga, and stealing and capturing the traditionally Melanau regions of Oya, Matu, and Mukah. They penetrated all the way to Sambas, where they took control of Pontianak, Sanggau, and Sambas itself. They also expanded their dominion over Borneo to the south and southwest. They overcame Banjar (now Banjarmasin) on the east coast and took over parts of northern Borneo, albeit the latter took longer because of the dispersed towns. Awang Alak Betatar expanded the newly established Brunei territory by advancing his frontiers from the Tutong River to the Rejang river delta.

According to Chinese historical accounts, including "Nan Hai Zhi, Volume 7," Brunei ruled over nine regions in the 13th and 14th centuries, which is consistent with the Syair Awang Semaun. It describes how Awang Alak Betatar expanded his domain to include Sungai Igan and then took five more provinces from Johor on Borneo's west coast: Sarawak, Samarahan, Sadong, Mukah, and Kalaka. With the acquisition, Brunei's colonial territories became a total of fourteen, in line with reports that date back to the 10th century. Due to the influence of the Srivijaya, these provinces had slipped out of Brunei's authority, but in the middle of the 14th century, Awang Alak Betatar regained them, solidifying Brunei's historical geographical reach.

Brunei was still ruled by the Javanese, but according to "Ming Tai Zu Shi Lu, Volume 67," it confirmed its authority over 14 states. This figure is consistent with Brunei's oral traditions and corresponds with the country's 10th century geographical dominance, as documented in "Zhu Fan Zhi" (977). The myth, passed down orally, tells of a prince who, while searching for a missing spear, got married in each of the fourteen states he went to, bearing sons who were subsequently made rulers of these communities. The Chinese accounts verify Brunei's historical authority over fourteen territories, even with their mythological components.

=== Golden age of Brunei (1408–1770) ===
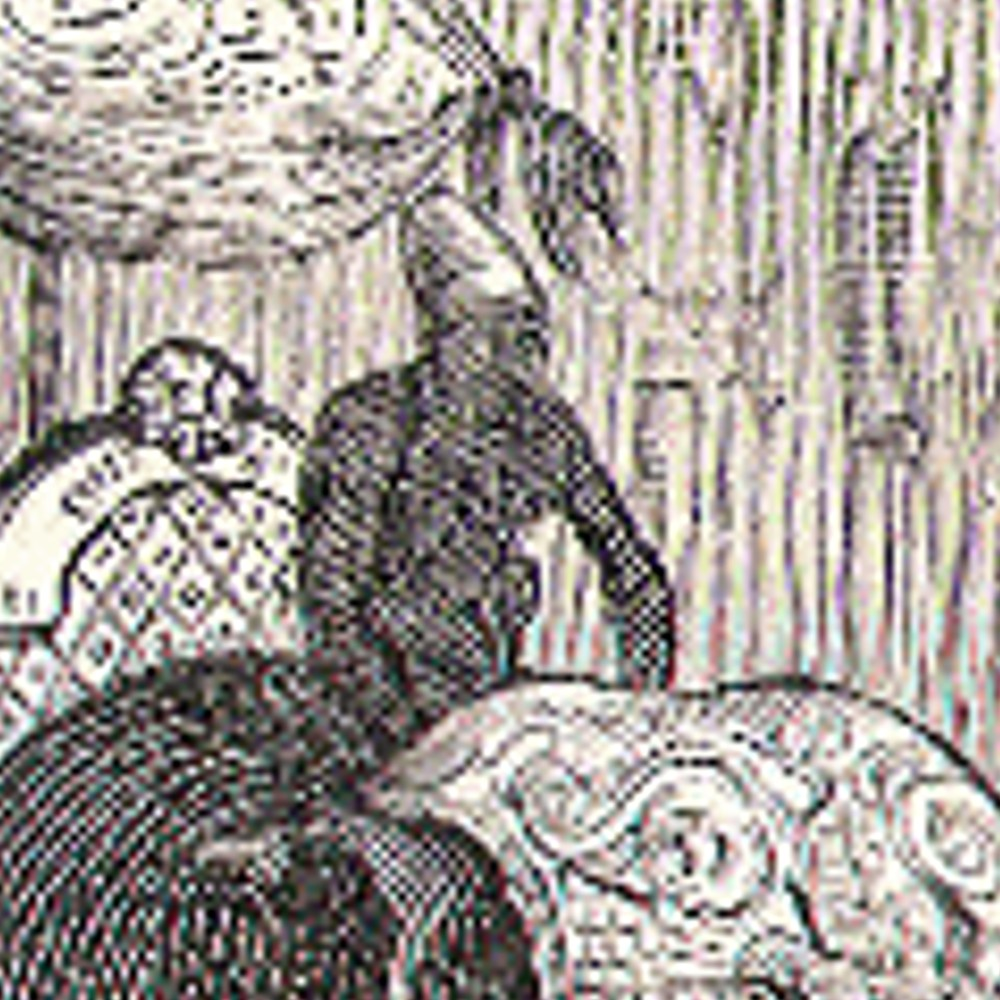
A cropped portrait of Bolkiah.

In 1408, Brunei de jure broke away (Note: The sultanate was already de facto independent by 1363.) from the empire of Majapahit under the reign of Sultan Sulaiman, the father of Bolkiah, who would start Brunei's golden age or "Pax Bruneiana".

After his father's abdication, Bolkiah succeeded him, during his early reign in the 15th century, a junk ship, which sailed from the Ming dynasty, was shipwrecked on Bruneian shores, the ship itself contained hand cannons.

In 1521, Antonio Pigafetta recorded that Brunei's navy had a fleet of more than one hundred boats, and which were involved in an attack on a faction in the south which alludes to modern day Indonesia, Kalimantan.

In 1578, the Spanish invaded Brunei in the Castilian War, for their proselytization of Islam in the Philippines, attacking the capital of Brunei at the time, Kota Batu, after the Spanish captured it in the aftermath of the battle of Kota Batu, Saiful Rijal moved Brunei's capital to Saragua, temporarily, later they regained their strength after the Spanish force occupying the capital greatly weakened by an outbreak of cholera and dysentery.

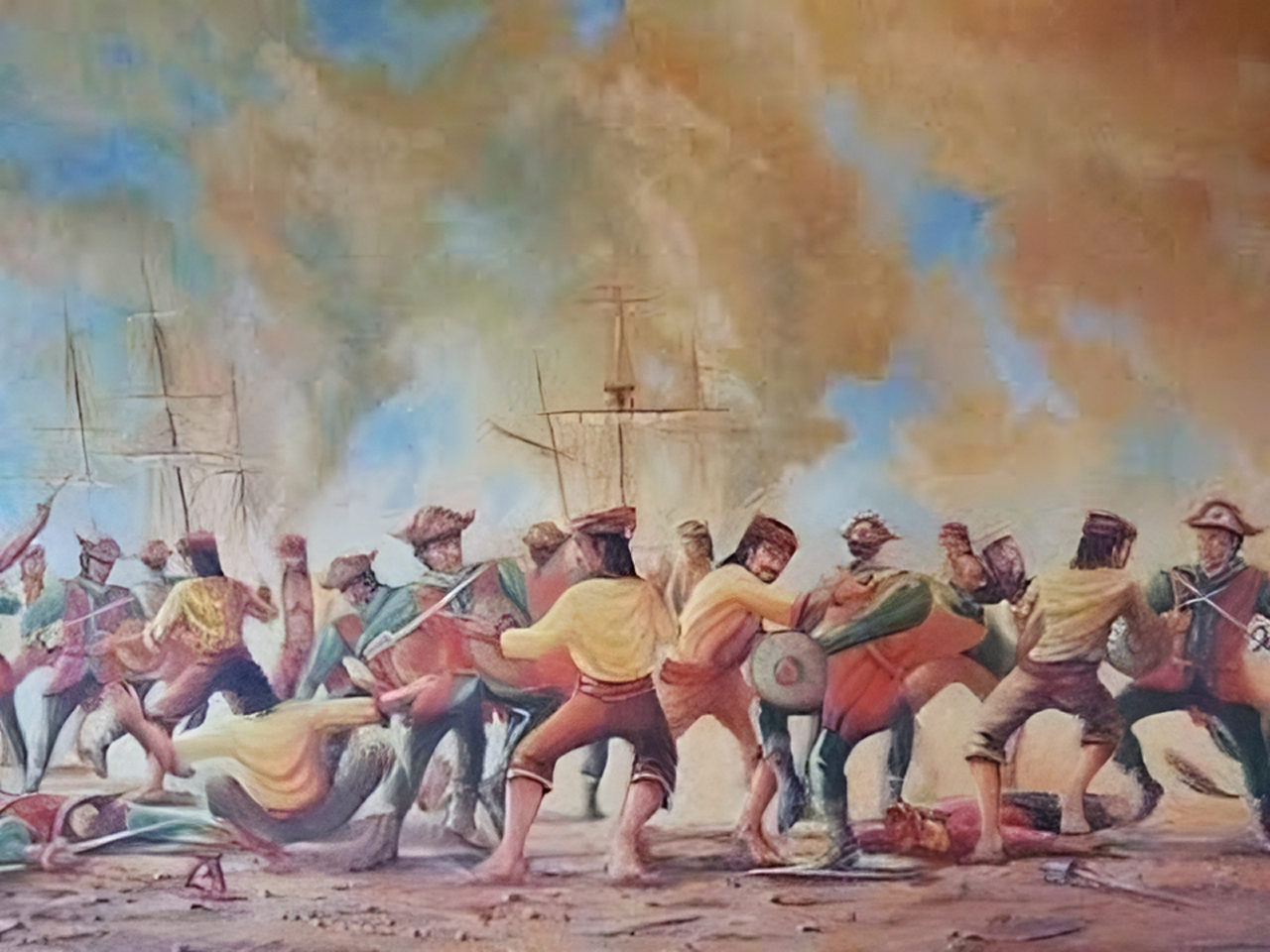
Bruneian forces fighting against Spanish forces

During Muhammad Hasan's reign, Muhammad Hasan commanded the attack on the Melanau in Sarawak, to be carried out by Pehin Orang Kaya Di-Gadong Seri Lela. After the Bruneian troops put an end to the uprising, the Melanau returned to Brunei and submitted.

It has been suggested that the insurrection of the Lun Bawangs and Chinese had led to the Sultan of Brunei requesting assistance from the Sulu to suppress the rebellion in 1658, which resulted in the Brunei Sultan ceding his territory of Kimanis until Tapean Durian to the Sultan of Sulu as a sign of gratitude. However it was likely taken back after the Apostate War.

In 1660, the Bruneian Civil War would start and split into two forces: Abdul Hakkul Mubin and Muhyiddin. During the course of the war, Muhyiddin was concerned that the civil war was dragging on for too long and asked the help of the Sultan of Sulu to send for his forces. He reportedly promised the land of eastern Sabah as a reward for the latter's assistance. During the civil war, Abdul Hakkul Mubin fled to Kinarut (in present-day Papar, Sabah, Malaysia) where, he stayed there for ten years, repelling repeated attacks by Sultan Muhyiddin. They returned to Brunei after a final attack by Muhyiddin's forces in which they failed to defeat Abdul Hakkul Mubin. Eventually, Muhyiddin finally defeated Abdul Hakkul Mubin in Cermin Island, after the purchasing of gunpowder, which came from Jambi.

The Sulu army was supposed to help Muhyiddin forces in Cermin Island, but when they arrived the Sulu army in their ships arrived just to watch Muhyiddin forces fight Abdul Hakkul Mubin forces instead of helping the Muhyiddin forces, they landed after the battle to take war booty and to enslaved prisoners. This would infuriated Muhyiddin, who ordered the Sulu army to leave without giving eastern Sabah to them. Brunei denied giving eastern Sabah to the Sulu Sultanate claiming there was no written evidence of the transfer, the civil war ended in 1673.

=== Struggle for Survival (1770–1870) ===
Sultan Omar Ali Saifuddin learned about the situation in Manila of the Philippines, due to it being Bruneian territory, he was not pleased. As a result, he gave command to attack Sultan Alimuddin in Manila with his forces under the command of Pehin Orang Kaya Di-Gadong Seri Lela Awang Aliwaddin in 1769. The mission didn't arrive in Manila until 1769 because the expedition's preparations took so long. Sultan Alimuddin had already departed Manila for Sulu, therefore Manila was under Spanish rule when the siege began. The siege would go on to be a success as Manila was captured by the Brunei sultanate.

The conflict over North Borneo, also known as Sabah, began after which a promise made by Sultan Muhyiddin to the Sultan of Sulu after Sulu helped him win the civil war that went in his favor. Sulu attacked Brunei in 1771 after he had become severely weakened. Sultan Omar Ali Saifuddin signed a deal with the British Empire in June 1774 to secure outside support. The British were looking for a storehouse along the way to Canton and received exclusive rights to the pepper trade in exchange for their military assistance. When Sulu despatch a force under the command of Datu Teting to attack Balambangan in 1775, its leaders sought safety in Labuan after the British quickly established a presence in Brunei. When the two forces clashed, Datu Teting surrendered and his troops fled back to Sulu after learning that the warriors of Brunei, led by Pengiran Temenggong Ampa, were far too strong for them to defeat. Thomas Forrest visited Brunei in February 1776. Despite Labuan's offer, the British left Brunei in 1777 due to the financial collapse of Balambangan, losing the entire East India Company.

In 1788, a Sulu army attacked Kampong Sembulan as an attempt to invade Brunei. They were defeated by Embo Amir who later became the caretaker of Kampong Sembulan.

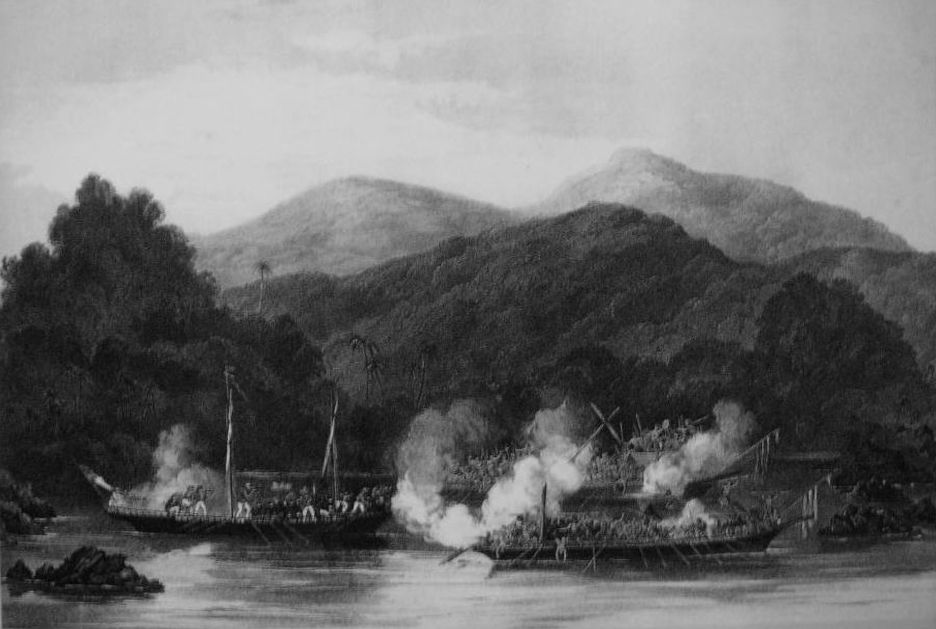
The Jolly Batchelor fighting Moro pirates in 1843.

In 1826, the Bruneian Civil War would start all over again into two forces: Omar Ali Saifuddin II and Muhammad Alam. With Omar setting his capital in Kampong Burong Pingai and Muhammad Alam setting his at Chermin Island. The civil war would end in 1828 when Muhammad Alam was assassinated by assassins sent by Raja Isteri Nooralam, the mother of Sultan Omar Ali Saifuddien II and the half-sister of Muhammad Alam.

In 1828, around the Brunei Bay and its surrounding area, the Bruneian navy and local flotillas attempted to intercept a major slave raiding party mostly succeeded as the Iranun fled to not risk high casualties.

The power of the army was weakening due to many factors such as Moro pirates constantly raiding the Bornean coast and the Sea Dayak raids on the river made it difficult for Brunei to properly centralise the empire.

The army was heavily weakened due to pirates, rebellion and constant infighting between Bruneian nobles and culminating in the upcoming uprising in Sarawak. Worsening this was the Sultan making a great political error in appointing Brooke as Rajah of Sarawak in 1841.

At first James stayed loyal to the agreement, he fought pirates and stabilised Sarawak however Brooke declared independence from Brunei in 1843, starting the Anglo-Bruneian War which was a British tactical victory however the Sultan succeeded in the long run as he eliminated dangerous political figures such as Pengiran Muda Hashim, Badruddin and Datu Patinggi Ali whose deaths made their power decline.

=== Fall (1870–1906) ===
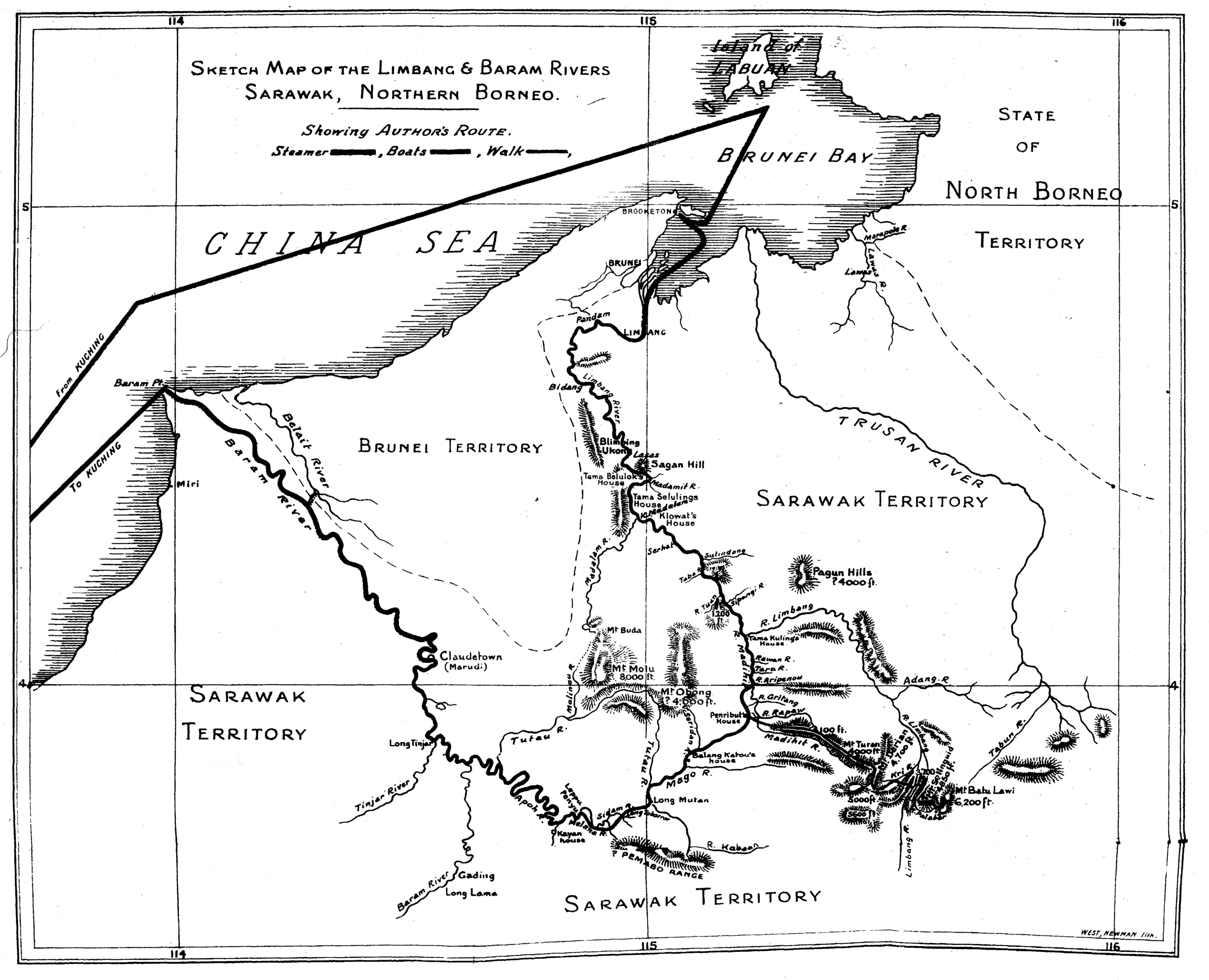
Sketch Map of Brunei, Limbang and the surrounding areas in 1912.

In 1884, the tulin region of Limbang rebelled against Pengiran Temenggong Hashim. The rebellion was the response of decades of Bruneian oppression, which started when the government imposed heavy taxes to the indigenous residents of Limbang in the 1850s, starting a series of revolts between the 1850s to 1860s.

The 1884 rebellion start when the Bisaya and Muruts refused to pay the high taxes collected by agents of Pengiran Temenggung Hashim. The first violence occurred when the residents killed two of the Sultan's tax agents in the Limbang district.

In retaliation, on 3 September 1884, the Bruneian army led by Hashim and Laksamana Tarip to battle the rebels, however the battle ended in a retreating defeat for Brunei, forcing them to flee, the rebels, chasing them out of Limbang.

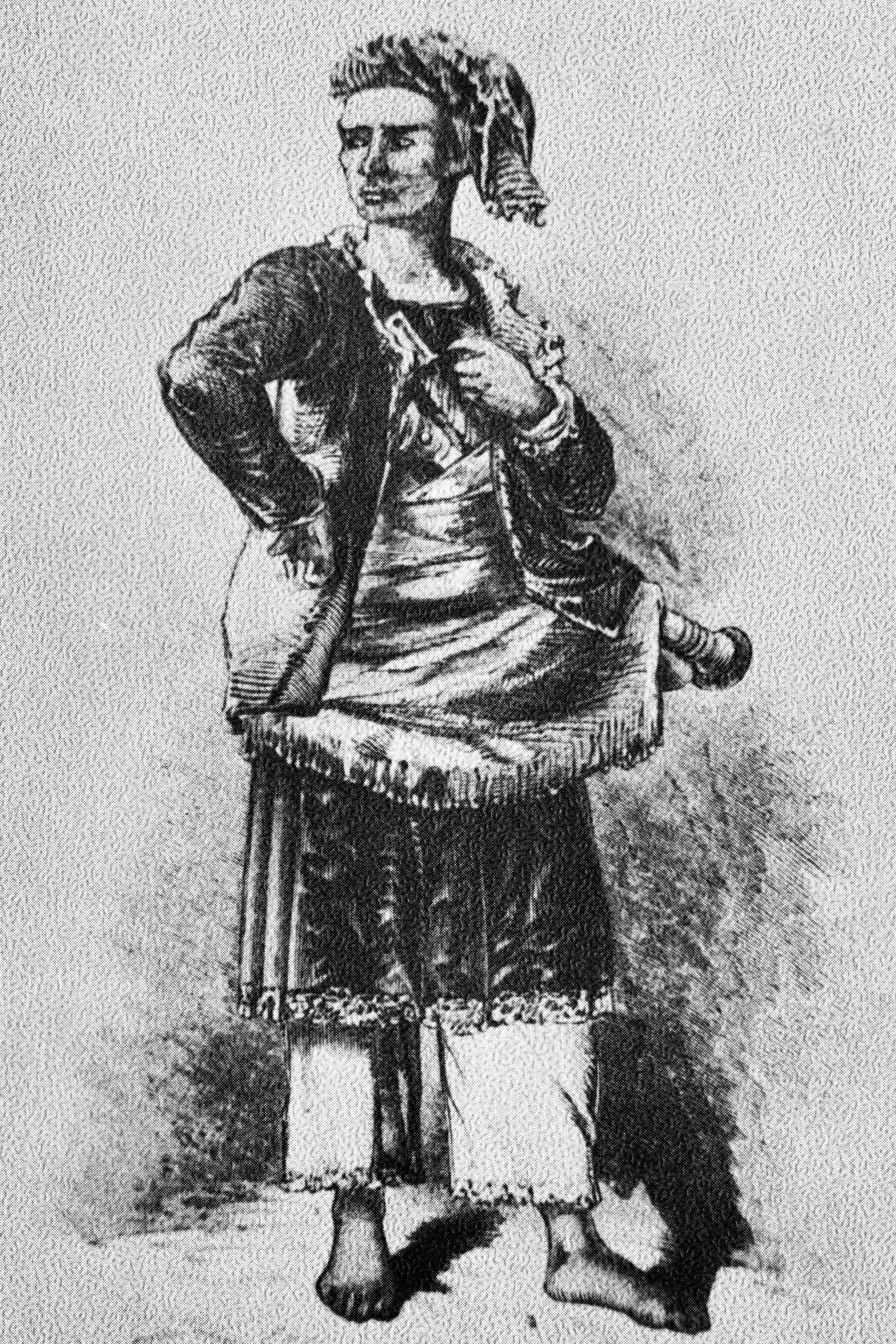
Illustration of Sultan Abdul Mumin, the second last ruling Sultan of old Brunei and the creator of the Amanat

With attacks on villages near the capital, Brunei Town. In October 1884, the nation was placed under high alert. Even Sultan Abdul Momin himself borrowed firearms from Labuan to strengthen his palace's security.

However, William Hood Treacher eventually helped to make a treaty between Brunei and the Limbang rebels, albeit with ulterior motives on behalf of the British North Borneo Company to prevent Charles from taking Limbang from them.

The shrinking territories led to Abdul Momin, realising his nation would become extinct if they kept ceding territories, declared the "Amanat" which was an oath between the Sultan, Wazirs, Manteris, and holders of Tulin rights not to cede or lease any remaining territories to the foreign powers and which was signed on 20 February 1885. However this oath was immediately broken by Pengiran Temenggong Hashim when he carelessly ceded Terusan and Limbang.

In 1888, another war started in Padas Damit between the said British North Borneo Company and Pengiran Shabandhar Bessar Mohd Salleh Panglima Hassan alongside other rebels such as Dang Insum and et cetera.

On 10 December 1888, British forces led by Governor Creagh launched their first major attack. They focused on this central fort, Kota Padas Damit to break the command of Pengiran Syahbandar Hassan. The fort was bombarded and captured early in the campaign, though Pengiran Syahbandar did not surrender.

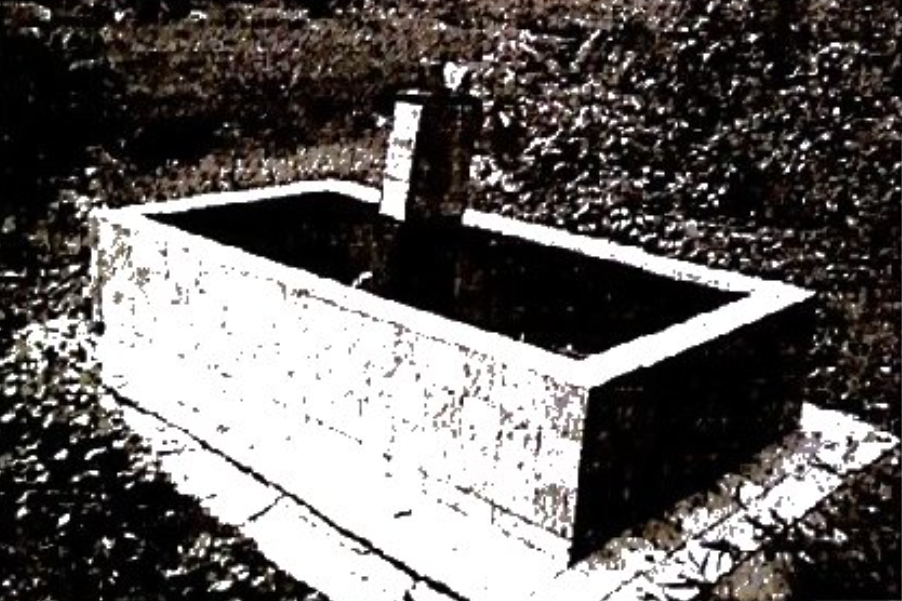
Dang Insum, whose grave is seen here, is regarded as one of the greatest female warriors ever seen in the history of Borneo.

In January 1889, after the fall of Kota Padas Damit, the British moved toward Kota Makarang, a fortified town along the Padas River. The Constabulary, with a force of 200 strong, fired on the city repeatedly with cannon beginning January 1889. Despite heavy resistance, the fort was destroyed by artillery fire. Dang Isum was killed on 10 March 1889, while fighting to defend the city.

On March until April 1889, Kota Galila fell as the British forces systematically cleared the Padas riverbanks in the months following the capture of Makarang.

In May 1889 was the final stronghold. Its strong construction and reputation for having a "magical" white cloth barrier made it the most difficult to take, marking the end of the war and the surrender of the resistance. The next day, the Company brought Pengiran Syahbandar to negotiate a peace agreement by setting several conditions, including that a criminal named Patek be handed over to the police and that Sungai Tulin Padas Damit be handed over to the company with an annual payment.

In 1888, The Protectorate Agreement of Brunei was officially signed by the Sultan of Brunei of that time, Sultan Hashim Jalilul Alam Aqamaddin and the British Resident of Perak, Hugh Low. It was witnessed by Dato Temenggong Kim Swee and L.H Wise. It was signed at Sultan Hashim's palace in "the city of Brunei", present day Kampong Ayer. The treaty marked the end of the Sultanate of Brunei and the beginning of British Protectorate Brunei. However even with this, Limbang was fully annexed by Sarawak by Charles Brooke on 17 March 1890.

Between 1899 and 1901, another rebellion started in Tutong and Belait when the Pengiran Bendahara at time, attempted to collect three years' worth of back-taxes from the Belait district. In response, local residents killed the tax collectors.

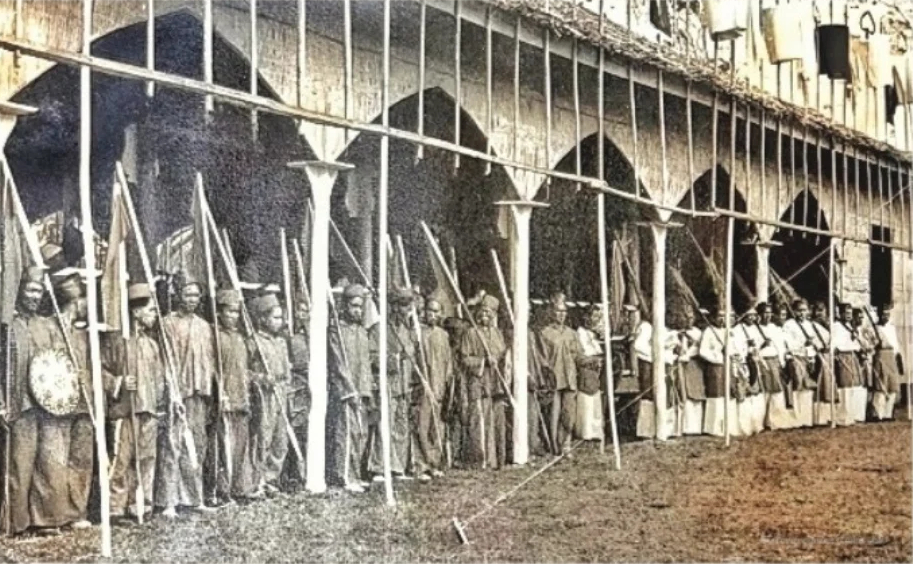
Awang-awang in 1949, Brunei Town (now Bandar Seri Begawan) in Lapau Kajang

By 1901, the situation escalated with reports of an attack on Tutong by roughly 500 men. This force represented nearly the entire adult male population of the district at the time. The leadership of the uprising was also controversial with Dato Di-Gadong, one of the central figures, being recorded as having killed three men in 1899 and shooting several people in 1901 for refusing to join his cause.

In July 1901, violence broke out in Birau, where four people were murdered and approximately 100 families were robbed and forced to flee to nearby Sarawak. The rebellion caused widespread instability, with roughly 200 families crossing the border into the Limbang district for safety during 1901 alone.

This old style of military is still alive today through the country's traditional palace guards called "awang-awang", recorded in during the reign of Sultan Muhammad Hassan, which the term would later evolve to become the modern "awang" by 1961.

== Organisation ==
In the forces of old Brunei, there were four kinds of units, the levy soldiers (tentera kerah), the royal guards (awang-awang), provincial soldiers (Note: Though this term is broad, this specifically refers to the army of the government agent sent to a frontier territory by the Sultan like in Sarawak Asal (modern day, Bau) and Sabah, for example the army under Pengiran Indera Mahkota Muhammad Salleh during the Sarawak uprising of 1836.) and dignitary soldiers, (Note: "Dignitary soldiers" here refers to thegns, retinues, retainers and followers of a dignitary.) the latter grew common by the early 18th century in the aftermath of the first Bruneian civil war and which James criticised it as "utterly inefficient". Structurally, all the units were the same with the exception of the royal guards, the only difference between the rest were their purpose and location of service.

Before the start of the first civil war, the Sultan could muster up 1,000–5,000 warriors., but after that, the army could muster around an estimated more than 6,000 warriors in total depending on the campaign, most definitely from how long the war had lasted.

Brunei's army was made up of many ethnicities, the Bruneian Malays, Kedayans, the Kayan, the Bisaya, the Sama-Bajau, the Iban and other ethnic groups under the rule of the empire.

=== Awang–awang ===
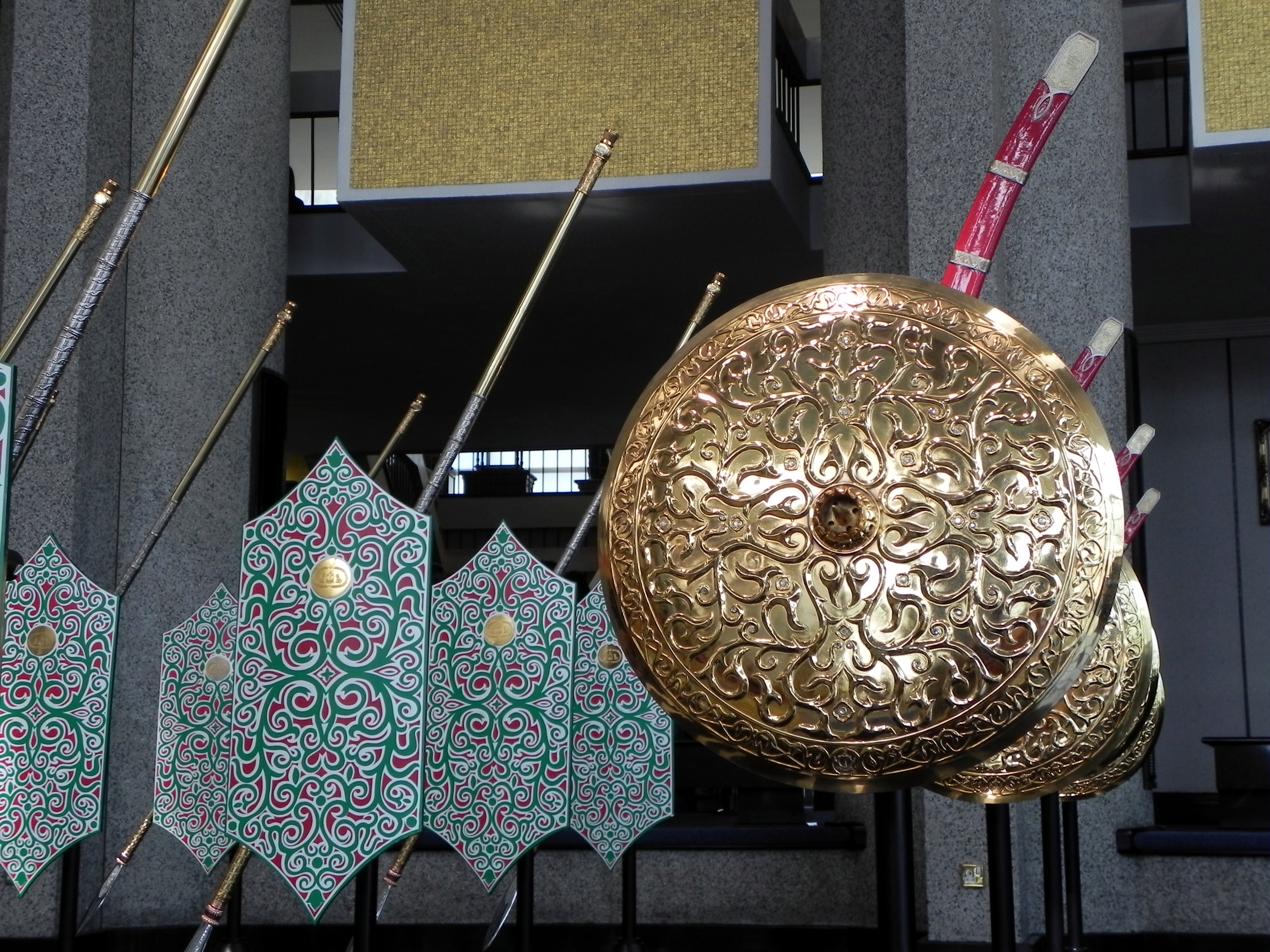
Royal weapons in Royal Regalia Museum, historically the awang-awang would have bore these weapons.

The awang–awang also historically known as "hawang" is defined by Professor Donald Brown as "aristocrats who claimed descent from non-Bornean nobility in the ancient past". The four main awang-awang branches were;

- Awang-awang damit
- Awang-awang Langgar
- Awang-awang biasa
- Awang-awang Pakerman

the awang-awang damit, famously Dato Godam's[ms] descendants are a part of this class of awang-awang, it is not exactly sure if it is the damit or biasa branch, however Brown suggested it was the former. Awang-awang damit, the highest of the awang-awang, allowed certain titles that the rest would not be allowed to, they were also usually attached to the Pengiran Bendahara. Awang-awang Langgar were below them, attached to the Pengiran Temenggong and notably bore the Lembing Bersampak Tembaga. The rest are unclear but it is assumed that the Pakerman were servants, as mentioned during the reign of Sultan Muhammad Hassan.

"Whenever the King sent delegations to larger countries, he appointed a chief envoy, envoy, a scribe, a treasurer and a captain, with Sakai (Note: Sakai is supposed to refer to Dayaks) as rowers and Hawang Pekerman as servants."

— Jamil Al-Sufri, History of Brunei in Brief, Brunei History Centre, Bandar Seri Begawan,

The title of Awang-awang is formally dissolved however their traditions are still kept by the Sultan of Brunei into the modern day.

== Strategies ==
Information of the strategies of the Bruneian army are rare, but what we know is that in the first Bruneian civil war, Sultan Abdul Hakkul Mubin used a war strategy, which was to cut off the food supply that came by sea, barring it from reaching the capital. With this blockade, hoping that Muhyiddin’s army would be left low on their food supplies. However, this strategy did not work out in the end due to Muhyiddin obtaining foreign support through the Sulu Sultanate.

In the Sarawak uprising, James Brooke described Bruneian warfare as:

"Their (Brunei) mode of warfare is puerile in the extreme. It consists in building stockades and firing at each other from a safe distance... A whole army will sit down before a small fort and wait for months in the hope of starving out the garrison."

— James Brooke later published by Henry Keppel, The Expedition to Borneo of H.M.S. Dido (1846),

With him as well, criticising the constant distrust and incompetency of amongst the Bruneian princes during the rebellion.

== Equipment ==
=== Arms ===
Sundang

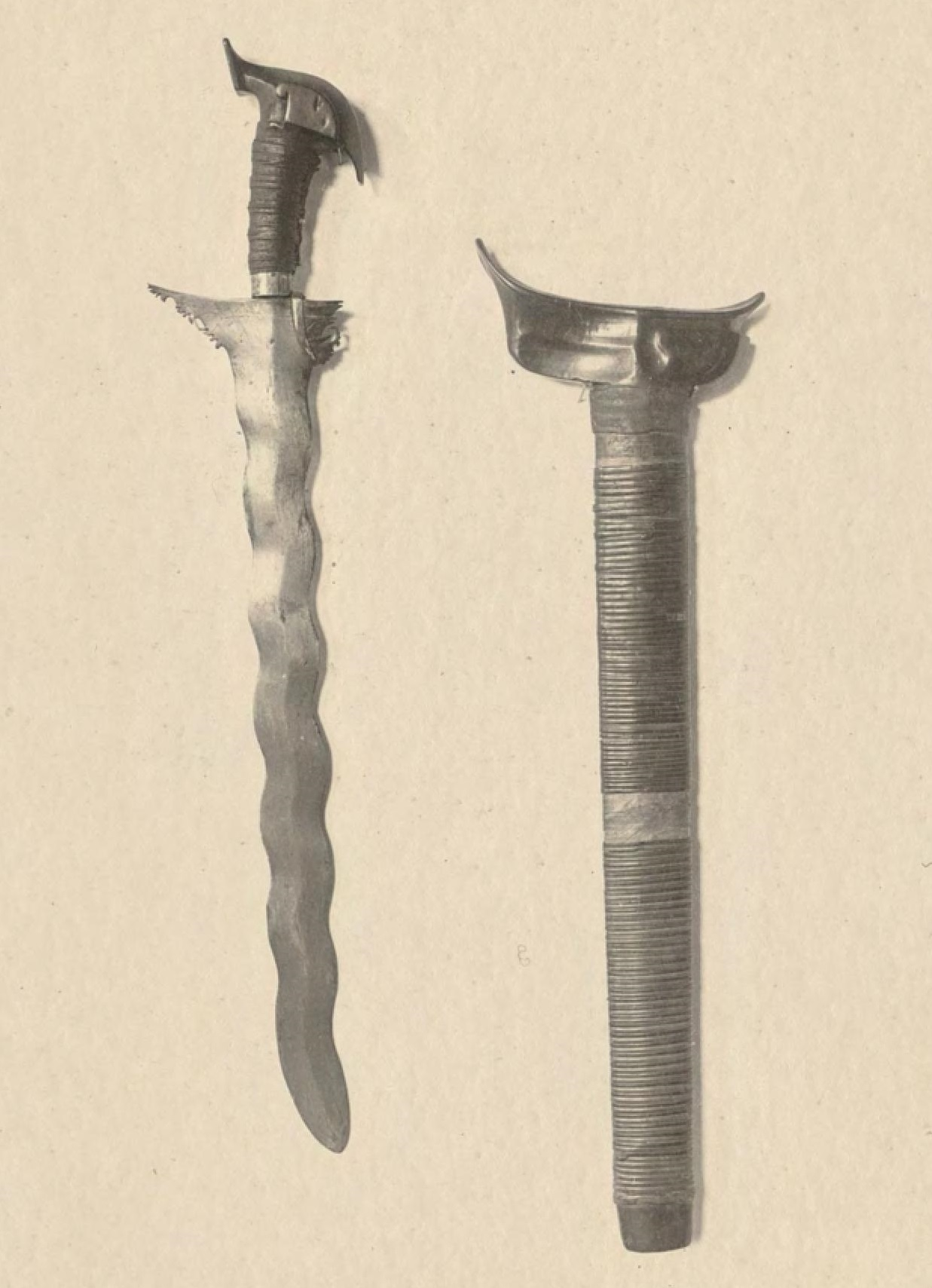
A sundang with a wavy blade

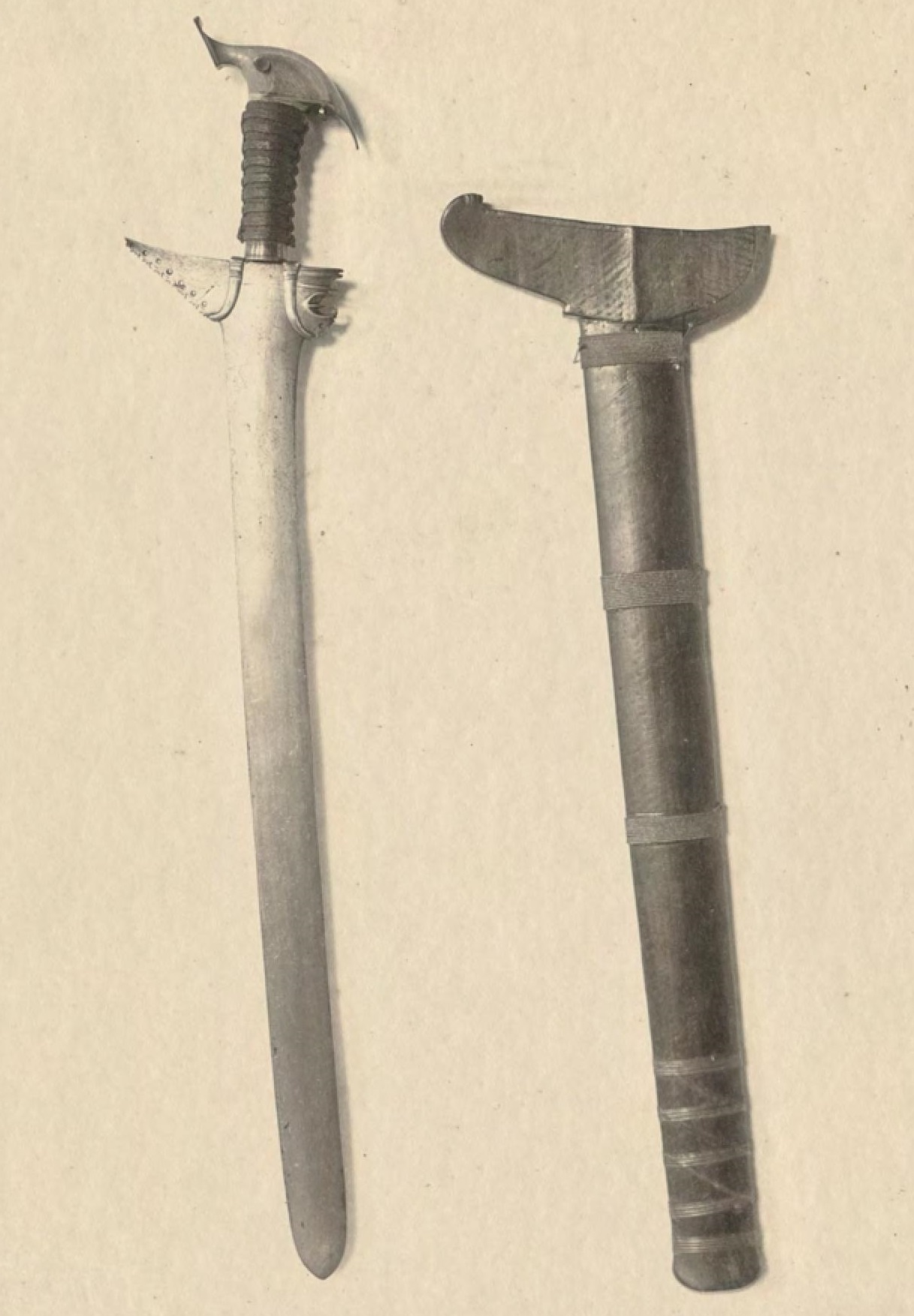
A sundang with a straight blade

Traditional weapons, especially variants of the spear and keris (specifically the sundang) were the most common weapons in the army before the Fall of Malacca in 1511 by the Portuguese, which said kind of weapons would be used in Awang Alak Betatar's conquest of Borneo in the early Bruneian conquests. In the 16th century, during the Spanish attack on Brunei in 1578. Francisco de Sande noted they both used spears and large swords which "they held with two hands", alluding to the use of the kampilan and cenangkas.

The army would have been equipped with gunpowder weapons until at least 1521, when Antonio Pigafetta found guns being produced in Palawan, which was controlled by Brunei at the time. We are not sure who truly introduced gunpowder weaponry into the sultanate but it was most probable, it was the Portuguese, who were trading with the sultanate after their conquest of Malacca in 1511, though there is also the possible chance of Gowa or other Malay states in the Malay Peninsula and Sumatra.

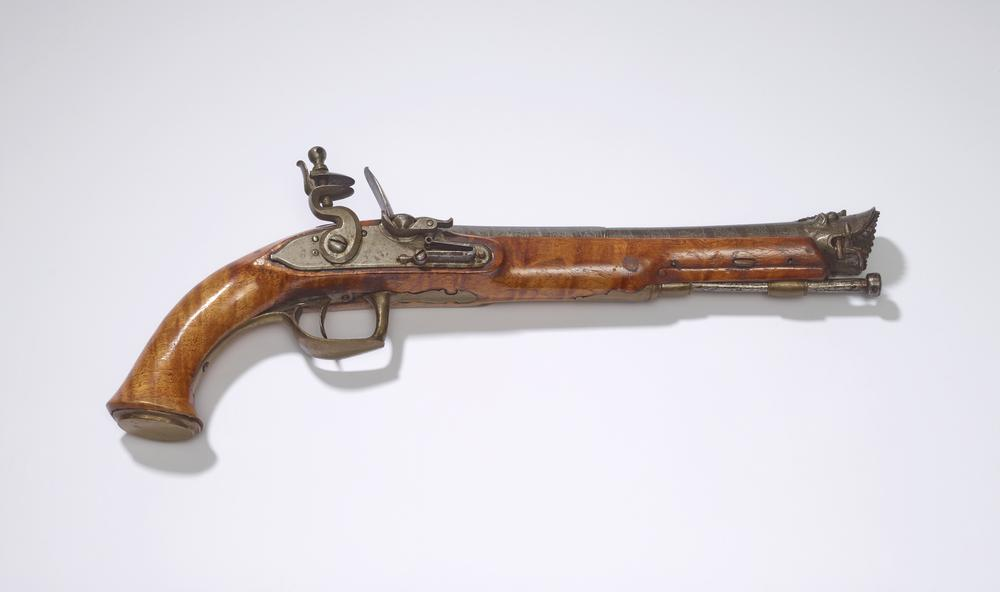
A flintlock pistol from the Sultanate of Brunei, acquired in 1869 by the British Museum.

Flintlocks were later introduced into the state around the late 17th century and early 18th century, after the arrival of the Dutch East India Company in the modern country of Indonesia and Malacca. Many of the Malay states including Brunei, depended on European powers for flintlock components, as no local metalsmiths were capable of producing such complex components, however the rest of the components, like the stock and barrel were locally made. At this time, many states including Brunei, began crafting bamboo and rattan barrel covering on top of their muskets in order to keep them dry in wet weather, later this technology would be spread to the Dayaks especially the Iban, whom would placed them in their ships.

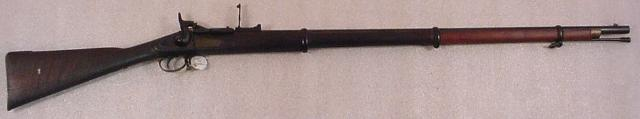
A Snider-Enfield rifle

The first Bruneian exposure to percussion muskets were in the late phase of the Sarawak uprising between 1839 until 1840 by James Brooke and his crew from the Royalist, as the crew were equipped with contemporary weapons. It is highly plausible that Brunei may have obtained percussion muskets later, around the 1850 to 1870 from the Straits Settlements or smuggled into the empire, which was rampant in the nearby Sulu Sultanate. This is backed up, as the British North Borneo Company accused of Mat Saleh of illegally procuring Snider–Enfield rifles, through modern day Brunei.

=== Artillery ===
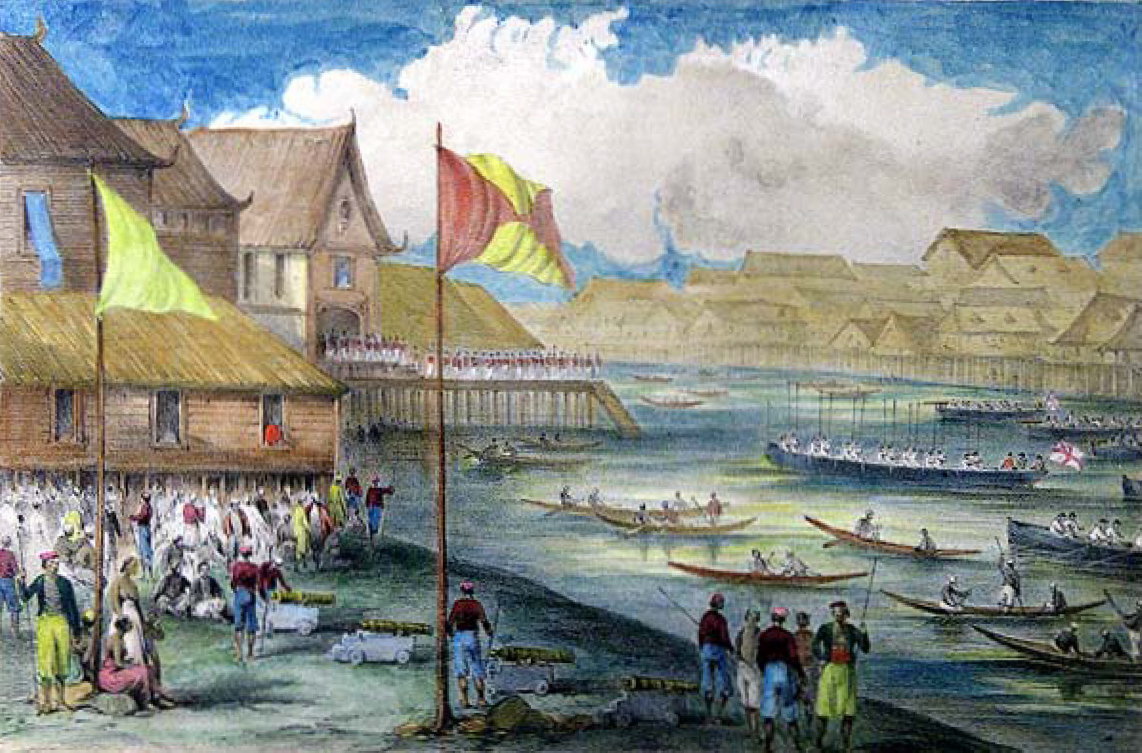
Treaty of Labuan in 1846 with cannons visible.

Between the late 15th century to early 16th century during the rule of Bolkiah, according to oral tradition was when he paid forty Javanese blacksmiths to teach metal casting, when the Sultan brought over some people from the island of Java, who would be the ancestors of the Kedayans, those forty blacksmiths are attributed to have introduced cannon technology to Brunei. With most cannons were made of bronze or brass and the earliest ones were breechloaders. Michael Charney pointed out that early Malay swivel guns were breech-loaded.

In 1600 CE, lela cannons were becoming more common in the archipelago. Several renowned foundries of the Malay World were Terengganu in the Malay Peninsula and Brunei and Banjarmasin in Borneo.

Brunei was known for its foundries in the 19th century. Brass was the preferred metal as it was cheaper and easier to work compared to the related but harder alloy bronze, or iron. However, bronze is much stronger and was therefore more popular for use in making weapons. The process used was cire perdue using terracotta and a wax mould. There was later a trend toward muzzle-loading weapons during colonial era.

In 1845, in the aftermath of the first bombardment of Brunei Town, the British captured forty eight cannons, of whch ten were Spanish made under the reign of Charles III of Spain, alluding to a Bruneian attack of Manila in the Apostate War.

=== Ships ===
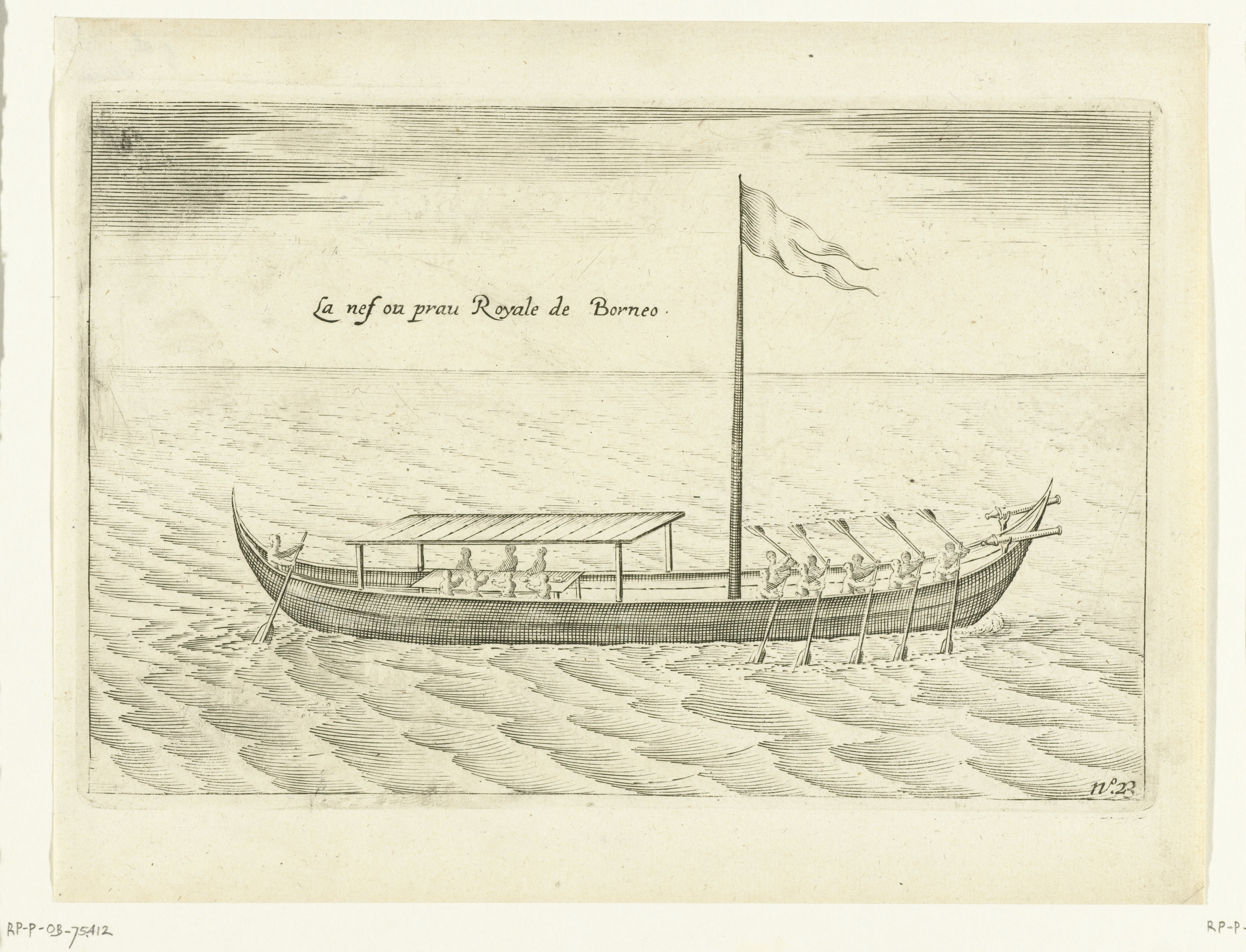
Royal boat of Brunei, armed with swivel guns, depicting a Bruneian penjajap.

The Sultan of Brunei maintained naval forces, employing both sailors and privateers especially the Sama-Bajau and would often perform slave raiding often against non-Muslims such as animist and Christians.

Also according to a legend, before Muhammad Shah converted to Islam and became the Sultan of Brunei, he was a legendary pirate lord. Brunei continued to maintain a de-centralized navy by the 1840s.

Most seafearers depending on their background would often use penjajap, kumpit, kakap, apilan and kota mara proas and bangkong; which was only used in riverine warfare. The penjajap were the more preferred ship by Malays and the bangkong was primarily used by Dayak Iban pirates which were usually outfitted Lela or Lantaka on their ships, as most Bornean ships was fast, able to almost encircle an armada of exactly forty Spanish galleons in the Castilian War and to bombard enemy settlements. Most Bruneian ships flew either a pennon or swallowtail variant of the Bruneian flag; depending on the ship.

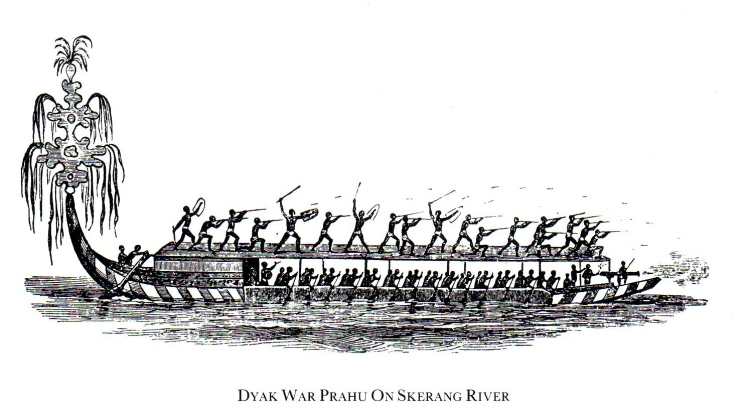
Iban war prahu on Skerang (Skrang) river

Piracy was also secretly encouraged by native rulers who usually wanted a share of the spoil and also by the Malays who knew well how to handle a boat. The Malay fleet consisted of a large number of boats, each boat was paddled by from 60 to 80 men. These boats skulked about in the sheltered coves waiting for their prey, and attacked merchant vessels making the passage in the South China Sea and the Strait of Malacca. The Malays and their Dayak allies would wreck and destroy every trading vessel they came across, murder most of the crew who resisted them, and the rest were made as slaves. The Dayak would cut off the heads of those who were slain, smoke them over the fire to dry them, and then take them home to treasure as valued possessions.

=== Attire ===
Attire

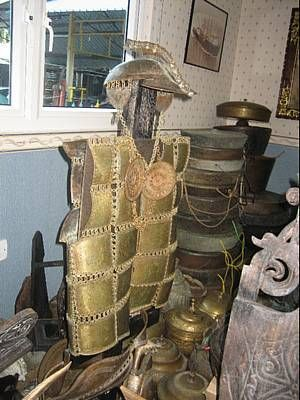
An armor consisting of a Lobster-tailed pot styled kechubong helmet (without the lobster tail) and plate armor.

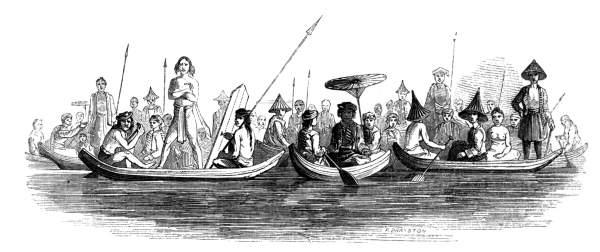
"Natives of Bruni" described as composed of embroidered chiefs, black-eyed women, grey-bearded Arabs, spears, shields, paddles and umbrellas by Frank S. Marryat in 1848

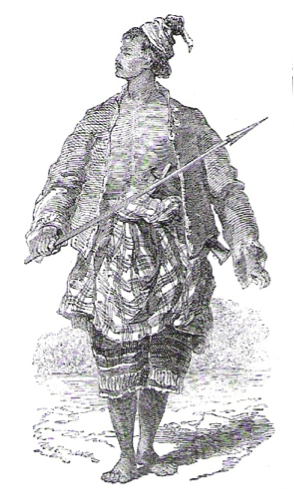
A Bruneian warrior, drawn in the 18th century with a spear and a keris, either a laskar (soldier) or pendekar (warrior), likely the former.

Before 1371, the Malay nobility wore the clothing of the Majapahit, however with the conversion of Islam in the region, they began adopting the clothing style of Parameswara's Sultanate of Malacca.

In the 16th century when de Sande, in his message to King Philip II of Spain, he describe the Bruneians as warlike, as well noting their use of wooden and iron helmets.

In the 19th century both John Hunt and later Henry Keppel both described Malay attire, with Henry referring to the Bruneian in specific, as wearing and relying on light clothing and having a keris in the girdle part of the sinjang.

The Bruneian elites also used two or more kerises to signify power and prestige according the James Brooke during the Sarawak Uprising of 1836. Many princes and their retainers and retinue also had brass helmets and chainmail, mostly of the baju lamina and kechubong helmet variety. With James praising their craftsmanship:

"The Pangerans and their followers were fully equipped with chain-armour and brass helmets; and their krisses, of which each person wore two or three, were of the most beautiful workmanship."

— James Brooke later published by Henry Keppel, The Expedition to Borneo of H.M.S. Dido (1846),

When muskets came in the 15th century, many used bamboo to place their gunpowder inside of the tube as a container, functioning similarly to that of a powder flask, this technique was used across the Malay world, however it should be noted they also used powder horns.

== Sources ==
- Haji Abdul Karim bin Haji Abdul Rahman (4 April 2016). Sejarah Pengasasan Dan Asal Usul Kerajaan Brunei Berdasarkan Sumber Lisan (PDF) (PhD thesis) (in Malay). Universiti Malaya.
- Ooi, Keat Gin (14 December 2015). Brunei - History, Islam, Society and Contemporary Issues. Routledge. ISBN 978-1-317-65998-3.
- Rabiqah Natasha Halim Binti Mohamed Yusof (March 2017). Brunei: Building and Enshrining an Absolute Monarchy (PDF) (Master of Philosophy thesis). Oxford Brookes University.
- Saunders, Graham E. (1994). A History of Brunei. Oxford University Press. ISBN 978-967-65-3049-3.
- Sidhu, Jatswan S. (22 December 2009). Historical Dictionary of Brunei Darussalam. Scarecrow Press. ISBN 978-0-8108-7078-9.
- Wright, Leigh R. (1 July 1988). The Origins of British Borneo. Hong Kong University Press. ISBN 978-962-209-213-6.
- Yunos, Rozan (2010). THE EARLY BRUNEI CONQUESTS. The Brunei Times.
