= Bombardment of Brunei Town (1846) =

- Part of Anglo-Bruneian War
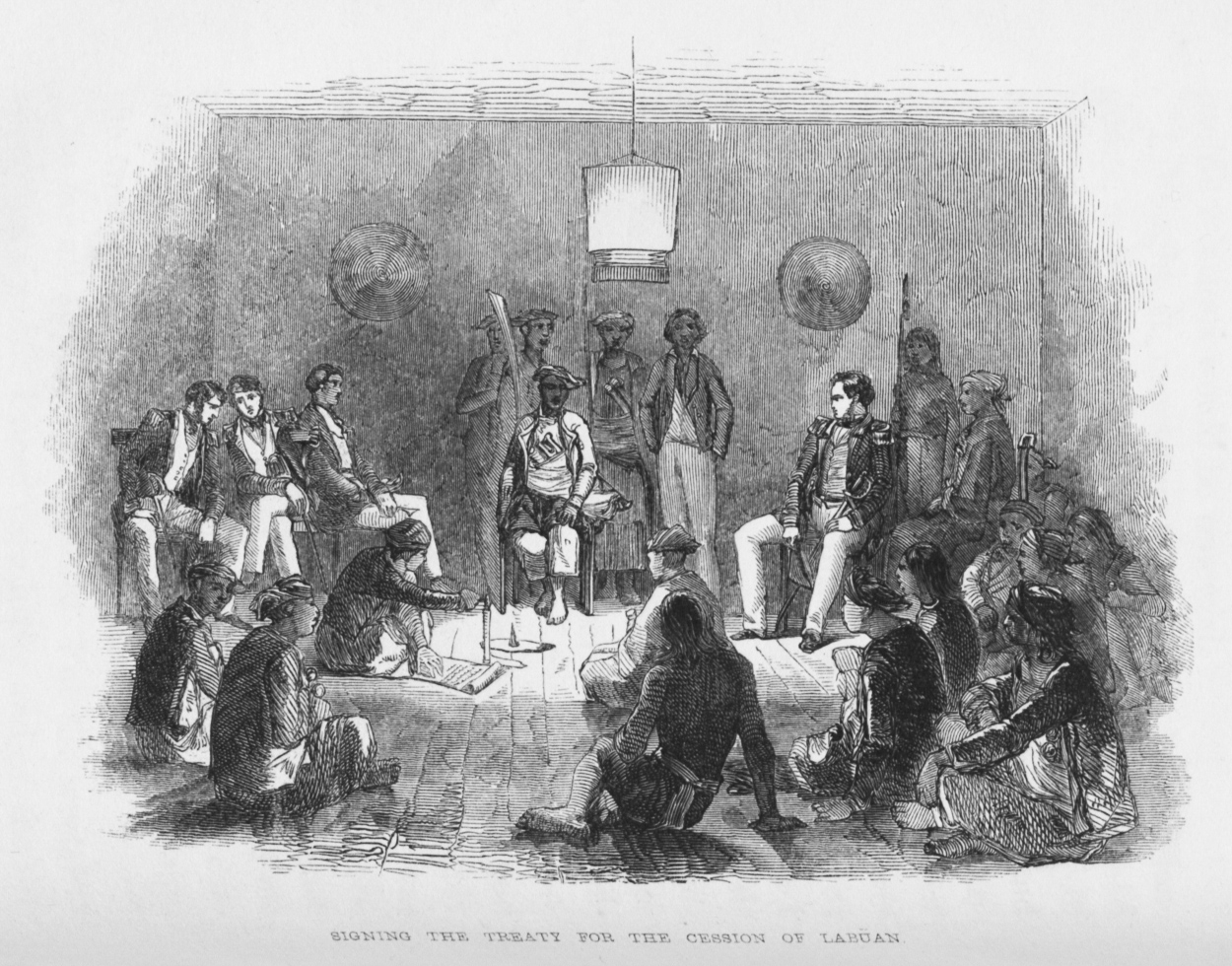
- The signing of the Treaty of Labuan between the Sultan of Brunei and the British delegation on 18 December 1846 at the Brunei palace
Date	1846 – 1847
Location	Brunei Town
Result	British victory; Labuan officially ceded to the British; British failure to replace the monarchy with a pro-British government

Belligerents
Bruneian Empire; House of Bolkiah	United Kingdom; Raj of Sarawak

Commanders and leaders
Sultan Omar Ali Saifuddien II; Pengiran Yusof (surrendered)	Admiral Sir Thomas Cochrane

Units involved
Sultan's guards	Royal Navy

Strength
500 guards 48 cannons	Squadron of from six to eight ships.

Casualties and losses
1 wounded 48 cannons captured	None

The Bombardment of Brunei Town (1846) was a British bombardment of the Bruneian capital, Brunei Town, in order to force the Sultan to make the Treaty of Labuan effective during the Anglo-Bruneian War. The incident succeeded in the purpose of forcing Brunei to effect a unfair agreement.

== Background ==
Previously, the Royal Navy had already went to Brunei Town in July 1845 but returned in August to release two Lascar seamen who were believed to be hidden there. Badruddin accused Yusof of being involved in the slave trade due to his close relations with a notable pirate leader Sharif Usman in Marudu Bay and the Sultanate of Sulu. Denying the allegation, Yusof refused to attend a meeting with Cochrane. Starting the Battle of Brunei Town. Fighting started when Yusof fired a cannon shot at Cochrane's squadron from his house. HMS Vixen fired on his house in retaliation, with Yusof fleeing.

Two days after Cochrane and his steamers left, Yusof seized the hill behind his late house with 300 Kedayans, and commenced an attack on Brunei Town, with Badruddin defeating him with a force similar in manpower. Yusof once again commenced another attack, this time using privateers likely from Marudu which were defeated by Hashim. He fled to Kimanis in northern Borneo, who was executed later.

== Bombardment ==
HEICS Phlegethon, HMS Spiteful and HMS Royalist then moved up to the river on 8 July where they were fired on from every position with slight damage. Mahkota and the Sultan retreated upriver while most of the population fled upon their arrival at Brunei's capital, leaving the brother of the Sultan's son, Pengiran Muhammad, who was badly wounded and Pengiran Mumin, an opponent of the Sultan's son who despised the decision of his royal family to be involved in conflict with the British. The British destroyed the town forts and invited the population to return with no harm to be done to them while the Sultan remained hiding in the jungle. Another expedition was sent to the interior but failed to find the Sultan. Brooke remained in Brunei with Captain Rodney Mundy and HMS Iris along with the Phlegethon and HMS Hazard while the main expedition continued their mission to suppress piracy in northern Borneo.

Soon after the signing of the 1846 treaty, the British put pressure on Sultan Omar Ali Saifuddin II to cede Labuan to the British. The Sultan refused and employed delaying tactics.

However the British navy lined up British warships near the Sultan's palace with cannons ready to fire if the Sultan refused to sign the treaty. The Sultan had no choice but to put the royal seal, symbolising the surrender of Labuan Island to Great Britain as a crown colony, ceding it to the British Queen "in perpetuity", to provide British traders with a harbour where they could protect their trade interests. After the signing, James Brooke was knighted and later appointed the first British governor of Labuan.

It was on 24 December 1846 when Captain Mundy, commanding HMS Iris (1840), took possession of Labuan, "in the Name of Her Majesty Victoria Queen of Great Britain and Ireland under the Direction of His Excellency Rear Admiral Sir Thomas Cochrane, C.B., Commander-in-Chief".

== Aftermath ==
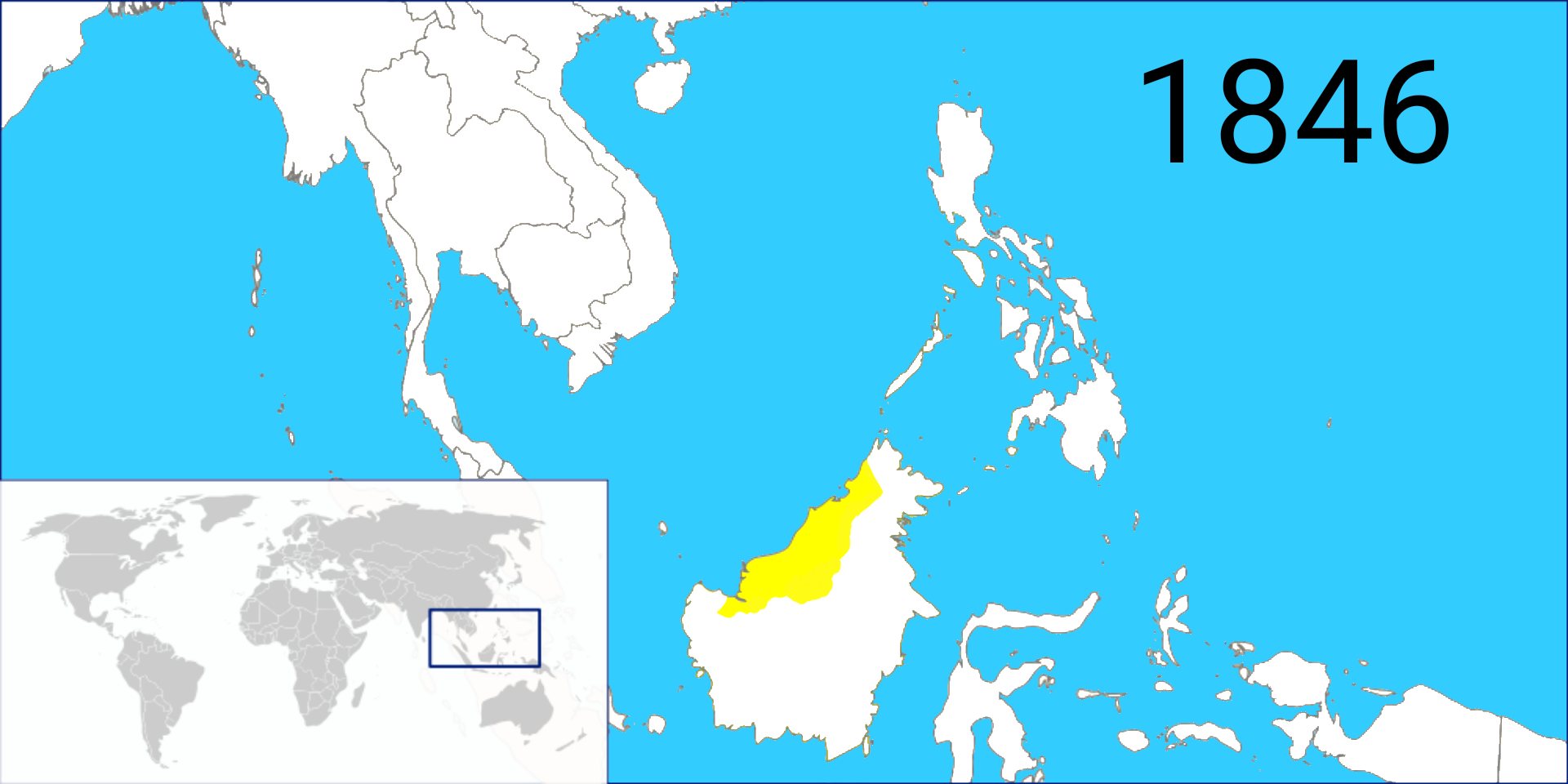
Brunei towards the end of Anglo-Bruneian War in 1846.

The cession of Labuan would end Anglo-Bruneian War officially on 27 May 1847 with the Anglo-Brunei Treaty of Friendship signed, however James Brooke's state of Sarawak Raj and his successors would continue to take Bruneian territories with the final cession being Limbang in 1890 under Charles Brooke in the aftermath of the Limbang rebellion in 1884 against Pengiran Hashim, forcing Brunei to be a protectorate of Britain in 1888.

== Sources ==
- Evans, Stephen R.; Rahman Zainal, Abdul; Khet Ngee, Rod Wong (1996). The History of Labuan Island (Victoria Island) (PDF). Calendar Print Pte Ltd. ISBN 978-9-81007-764-8. Archived (PDF) from the original on 25 August 2025 – via Wasabi Technologies Storage.
- Gott, Richard (2011). Britain's Empire: Resistance, Repression and Revolt. Verso Books. ISBN 978-1-84467-892-1.
- Miller, Harry (1970). Pirates of the Far East. Hale. ISBN 9780709114291.
- Mundy, Rodney (1848). Narrative of Events in Borneo and Celebes, down to the Occupation of Labuan: from the Journals of James Brooke, Esq. Vol. 1. John Murray.
- Pires, Tomé (1515). Suma Oriental que trata do Mar Roxo até aos Chins [An Account of the East, from the Red Sea to China] (in Portuguese).
- Royal Asiatic Society (1960). Journal of the Malaysian Branch of the Royal Asiatic Society. Vol. 33. Royal Asiatic Society.
- Saunders, Graham (2013). A History of Brunei. Routledge. ISBN 978-1-136-87394-2.
