= Battle of Brunei Town =

1845 Battle in Brunei Town

- Part of Anglo-Bruneian War
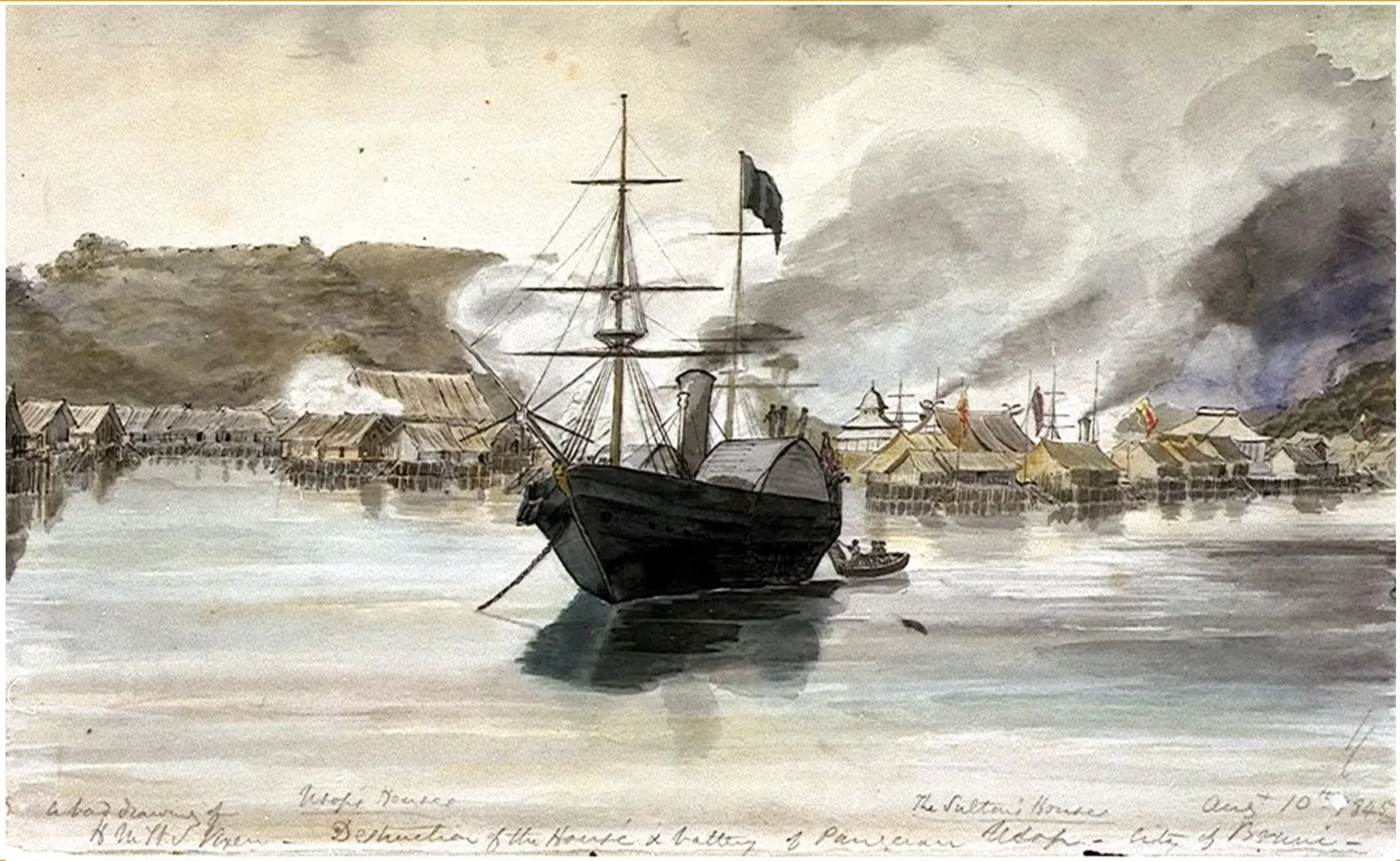
- HMS Vixen firing on Pengiran Yusof's house and battery
Date	1845
Location	Brunei Town
Result	Sarawakian victory

Belligerents
Bruneian Empire; House of Bolkiah	United Kingdom; Raj of Sarawak; House of Digadong

Commanders and leaders
Sultan Omar Ali Saifuddien II; Pengiran Yusof (surrendered)	Admiral Sir Thomas Cochrane; Pengiran Budaruddin; Pengiran Muda Hashim

Units involved
Bruneian Army; Bruneian Navy	Sarawakian Army; Royal Navy

Strength
~100 warrior 1 cannon 300 Kedayans; 7 proa	1 gunboat ~300-400; ~100

Casualties and losses
Unknown	Unknown

The Battle of Brunei Town was a battle that occurred in Brunei Town, modern day Bandar Seri Begawan. The battle was part of the Anglo-Bruneian War between the Royal Navy and the Sarawakian forces lead by Rear-Admiral Thomas Cochrane, Pengiran Badruddin and Pengiran Muda Hashim respectively and the forces of Pengiran Yusof

== Background ==
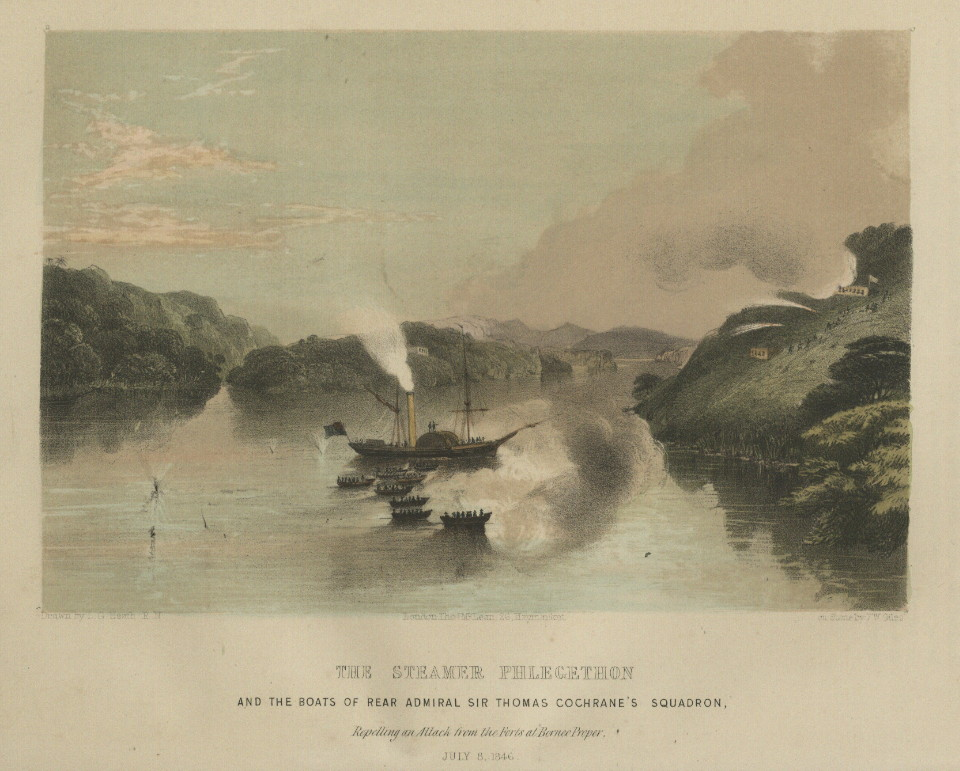
Phlegethon repelling an attack from the forts of the Sultanate of Brunei on 8th July 1845

In August 1845, Cochrane who previously arrived at Brunei in July, reappeared with a handful ships to release two Lascar seamen who were believed to be hidden there. Badruddin accused Yusof of being involved in the slave trade due to his close relations with a notable pirate leader Sharif Uthman in Marudu Bay and the Sultanate of Sulu. Denying the allegation, Yusof refused to attend a meeting with Cochrane.

Yusof was a rogue noblemen, he was likely associated with Muhammad Alam who fought against Omar Ali Saifuddien II over control of the sultanate in the Bruneian Civil War of 1826. He was very unpopular as the villagers of Kampong Burong Pingai turned against him. He likely only supported Muhammad Alam due to the fact Muhammad Alam opposed Western influence. He, mostly probably married into the family of Uthman. And therefore an ally of Sharif Uthman.

== Battle ==
Fighting started when Yusof fired a cannon shot at Cochrane's squadron from his house. HMS Vixen fired on his house in retaliation, with Yusof fleeing.

Two days after Cochrane and his steamers left, Yusof seized the hill behind his late house with 300 Kedayans, and commenced an attack on Brunei Town, with Badruddin defeating him with a force similar in manpower.

He once commenced another attack, this time using sailors from Marudu which were defeated by Hashim.

== Aftermath ==
Yusof fled to Kimanis in northern Borneo, who was reported to be executed but recent research suggests otherwise. His faction's power continued to grow until 1906.
