= Battle of Sembulan =

1788 Battle in Sabah

- Part of Apostate War
Date	1788
Location	Sabah, Kampung Sembulan
Result	Bruneian victory

Belligerents
Bruneian Empire; Mengkabong; Marudu; Tempasuk; Abai	Sulu Sultanate; Pirates

Commanders and leaders
Muhammad Tajuddin; Pengiran Temenggong Ampa; Embo Ali; Raja Tua of Mengkabong (Note: "Raja Tua" is a title, not a name.)	Azim ud-Din II; Datu Teting

Units involved
Bruneian Army	Banguingui warriors

Strength
5,000+; 2,000 Sama-Bajau; thousands of Johor seafarers; Illanun warriors in Marudu, Mengkabong, Tempasuk and Abai	Unknown

Casualties and losses
- Unknown

The Battle of Sembulan or also known as the Battle of Simbulan was the last major land battle between the Sultanate of Sulu and the Bruneian Empire in the Apostate War.

== Background ==
Kampung Sembulan alternatively spelt as Simbulan was a Bajau fishing village near Deasoka (now, modern day Jesselton). Kampung Sembulan is now known as Kampung Sembulan Lama.

The Sulu and their allies would seasonally would raid the coasts of Bruneian territory especially in Sabah. And one of these was Kampung Sembulan which the Bruneian army were heading to foil their attacks. The army was previously at a base in Menggatal in the Mengkabong kingdom, an ally of Brunei.

== Battle ==
The Bruneians numbered more than 5,000 soldiers, 2,000 were Sama-Bajau, Johor seafarers and Iranun warriors from Marudu, Mengkabong, Tempasuk and Abai from Kinarut and defeated the Sulu army which was made of the Banguingui.

== Aftermath ==
After the battle, a Hulubalang who fought in the battle, Embo Ali alternatively known as Embo Amirullah became the official "caretaker" of Kampung Sembulan and stayed connected with Brunei until 1790. Embo Ali's family was also the participants in the Marudu expedition against James Brooke in support Pengiran Yusof and Sharif Uthman during the Anglo-Bruneian War, Gaya and Pandasan War.
