= Melanau Rebellion of 1795 =

Rejang War
Date	1795
Location	Rejang and Mukah
Result	Bruneian victory

Belligerents
Bruneian Empire	Melanau

Commanders and leaders
Muhammad Tajuddin; Pengiran Temenggong Abdul Raub	

Strength
- Unknown

Casualties and losses
- Unknown

The Melanau Rebellion of 1795 was a rebellion in the modern districts of Rejang and Mukah by the Melanau people.

== Background ==
After the accession of Muhammad Tajuddin in 1778, he put an emphasis on trade, trading with the Spanish Philippines, Dutch East India Company and Portuguese Macau, which started with the Portuguese in 1794.

At the time, Rejang and Mukah were one of the regional economic epicenters of the lucrative sago trade, as Rejang and Mukah produced and processed it, Pengiran Digadong Muhammad Kanzul Alam most probably sought to exploit of the districts to have monopoly on the sago trade, putting heavy taxes upon the Melanau, which had been done a century before.

== War ==
When the rebellion started, the Sultan sent Pengiran Temenggong Abdul Raub to the region to quell the rebellion, using an army of levy soldiers, they attacked the Melanau. The Melanau, most definitely retreated to their tall houses (rumah tinggi), these houses were made for repelling the Dayak tribes like the Iban, they used lances and blades to hardly pass through, the Melanau also poured boiling water onto the floor when attacked from below, the floor having small gaps to make it effective, with the forces exchanging fire, eventually forcing the Melanau to surrender due to starvation.

== Aftermath ==
With the surrender, the Bruneians reestablished trading routes and re-imposed the heavy taxes. It is unknown what happened to the Melanau leaders involved, but they were likely executed for treason.
