= Limbang Rebellion (1884) =

Date	August 1884 – October 21, 1884
Location	Limbang
Result	Rebel victory
Territorial changes	Later annexed by Sarawak in 1890 with consent of the chiefs in Limbang in 1887

Belligerents
Native rebels Raj of Sarawak	Brunei

Commanders and leaders
Datu Klassie (POW); 15 other local chiefs	Abdul Momin; Pengiran Temenggong Hashim; Laksamana Tarip †

Units involved
Lun Bawang; Bisaya; Kayan	Bruneian Army

Strength
300+ men	small (unspecified)

Casualties and losses
- Unknown

The Limbang Rebellion of 1884 was a crucial war between the Sultanate of Brunei and the indigenous residents of Limbang that led to the annexation of Limbang on 17 March 1890 by Charles Brooke.

== Background ==
The rebellion had its roots during the reign of Sultan Omar Ali Saifuddien II, when theBisaya and Lun Bawang, rose in rebellion against the Bruneian sultanate in the 1850s. This rebellion started because residents there were made upset, when the government and Bruneian princes of Limbang imposed high taxes on them.

The rebellion started again, against Brunei in 1860. This movement also occurred for the same reason as above. However this rebellion was quelled by Brunei, with the help of the Kayan tribe. Initially the Kayan were the essentially Brunei henchmen, however after Charles Brooke managed to spread his influence on them, they turned hostile against Brunei.

August 1884 is considered the start of the rebellion when the Bisaya and Lun Bawang refused to pay the high taxes collected by agents of Pengiran Temenggung Hashim. The first violence occurred when the residents killed two of the Sultan's tax agents in the Limbang district.

== War ==
In retaliation, on 3 September 1884 Hashim and his admiral, Laksamana Tarip and the Bruneian army launched an attack to punish the rebels. However, he faced a very strong resistance from the Bisayans and Muruts, to make it worse, during the battle, Laksamana Tarip was killed. Thus, he was forced to retreat, and he returned to the capital, Brunei Town. When the Limbang rebels learnt of the Bruneian army's retreat, they took advantage of their enemy's weakened forces. They launched a strike on Malay villages nearby the capital.

There, they received a reinforcement of three hundred men from the Kayan, and fought even more aggressively. It was most possibly Charles Brooke, who sent the Kayans to strengthen the rebels. It was likely to continue a sense of chaos and unrest in the region based on the fact that, at that time Charles had recently controlled over Baram in 1882, bought from the Sultan of Brunei. In which, was the homeland of the Kayans. Also, the Kayans were one of the historic enemies of the Lun Bawang and Bisaya peoples, originally one of the main native henchmen of Brunei.

With the village attacks near Brunei Town. This caused the capital to be in a state of panic and worry, so in October 1884, Brunei was placed under high alert. Even Sultan Abdul Momin himself borrowed firearms from Labuan to strengthen his palace's security.

In order to find a solution to ease the tension, the Bisayans and Lun Bawang sent a representative, Datu Klassie, to the capital, to negotiate the terms for peace and ceasefire. As soon as he and his wife reached the capital however, Hashim captured and imprisoned them. William Hood Treacher, initiated to resolve the conflict between the Bruneian government and the Limbang rebels. Therefore, Treacher acted as an intermediary, as part of his duties as acting Consul General.

However, he had an ulterior motive. On behalf of the British North Borneo Company, he wanted to gain control over Limbang. Treacher wanted to prevent this territory from falling into Brooke's hands. In order to do so, he himself once threatened Sultan Abdul Momin and Pengiran Di-Gadong Anak Muhammad Hassan, the landlord of several Tulin territories in Limbang. To illustrate, Treacher threatened to stop the British North Borneo Company's lease payment to the sultan if Limbang was given to Sarawak. The company had leases of Sabahan lands belonging to Brunei.

== Outcome ==
Treacher mediated peace between the sultanate and the rebels. In the treaty, there were terms set:

1. The Bruneian government would free Datu Klassie and his wife.
2. The imposed taxes, which were considered high and burdensome to the people of Limbang, would be abolished.
3. The rates of existing taxes would be cut from their previous rates.
4. The sultan-appointed agents would no longer collect taxes, and this task would be taken over by the leaders of the Limbang communities. They would then pay the taxes collected to the Bruneian sultanate.
5. The rebels had to be disarmed and a ceasefire would take place.

After agreeing to the treaty, relations between the two parties were restored before the rebellion. On 29 May 1885, Abdul Momindied and Temenggong Hashim ascended to the Brunei throne to become Sultan Hashim.

In 1887, Weld then consulted the chiefs of the Limbang River. They firmly rejected Sultan's rule and were willing to accept a "white man's rule". Weld tried to push an ultimatum that the Sultan either agreed on the cession of Limbang or to accept a Resident. Sultan Hashim hesitated. Crocker, the acting governor of North Borneo, advised the Sultan that if he did not accept a Resident in Limbang, James Brooke will be permitted to seize Limbang without any compensation to the Sultan. Sultan Hashim decided to accept a Resident after Crocker's advice.

On 17 September 1888, Brunei signed an agreement with Great Britain which formally put Brunei under British protectorate. Sir Rutherford Alcock, managing director of North Borneo Company, Sir Robert Meader, assistant under-secretary of the colonial office, and Sir Federick Weld thought that making Brunei a protectorate will enable the final division of Brunei and stem further losses of Bruneian territories. However, British prime minister Lord Salisbury was eager for Brunei to vanish from the world map before the protectorate agreement was signed. He finally agreed to the protectorate treaty after he was assured by his officials that the protectorate status granted to Brunei will not stop its ultimate absorption into either Sarawak or North Borneo. Acting Consul Hamilton decided to go to Limbang in October 1889 to assess the people's sentiments there. The Limbang chiefs gave the same assertions that they will never submit to Sultan's rule. On 17 March 1890, Rajah Charles Brooke annexed Limbang, subjected to the approval of the British government, claiming that the local chiefs of Limbang had been independent of Brunei's rule for five years and had hoisted a Sarawak flag.
