= Belait Rebellion =

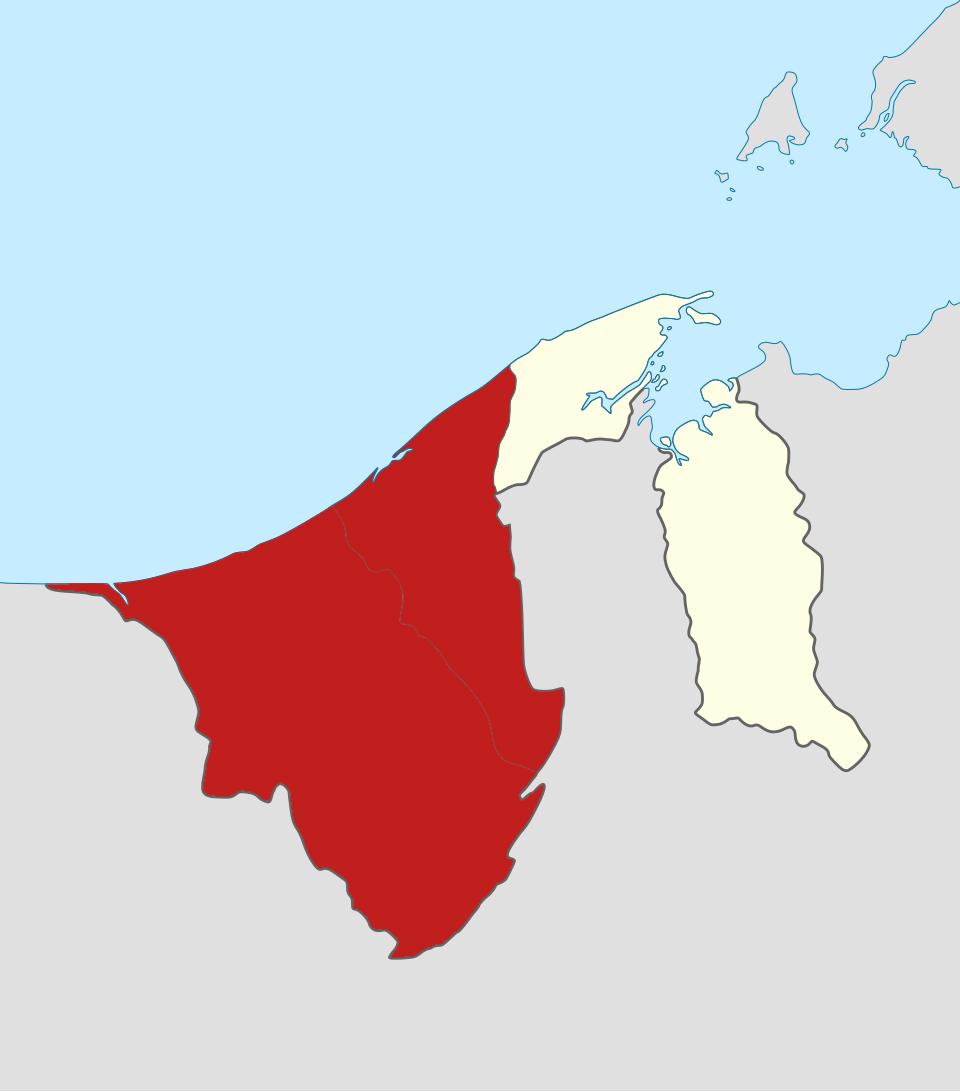
- Belait and Tutong coloured in red
Date	1899 – 1902
Location	Tutong and Kuala Belait
Result	Bruneian victory

Belligerents
Belait; Raj of Sarawak (until 1901)	Brunei; British Administration of Brunei (diplomatically)

Commanders and leaders
Dato Di-Gadong (executed); Dato Kallam (executed); Charles Brooke	Hashim Jalilul Alam Aqamaddin; Bendahara Anak Besar

Casualties and losses
- 4 civilians killed 100 families robbed at least 200 families fled to Sarawak

The Belait Rebellion, also known as the Tutong–Belait Rebellion or simply the Belait War, was the last war participated by Brunei, before the Second World War in the Southeast Asian theater and the Brunei revolt of 1962.

== Prelude ==
The rebellion started when the Pengiran Bendahara at time, attempted to collect three years' worth of back-taxes from the Belait district. In response, local residents killed the tax collectors.

In both Tutong and Belait, however the former had the worst treatment, they were forced to do dagang serah or forced trade where the representatives (penyuru) extorted the rural residents and natives to buy goods like cotton and brassware with unfair prices, higher than their actual value. In Tutong, the princes had many residents enslaved and forced the remaining to give heavy tribute.

== War ==
After the residents of Belait killed tax collectors sent by the Bendahara, Dato Di Gadong, alongside Dato Kallam began to raise up a force in Kampong Limau Manis. In 1899, Dato Di Gadong killed three men for refusing to join his revolution against Sultan Hashim Jalilul Alam Aqamaddin.

Early in 1901, Dato Di Gadong organised an uprising in Tutong purportedly with the backing of Rajah of Sarawak, Sir Charles Brooke, who wanted to use Brunei's instability as a pretext for annexing the area. Brooke's proposal was thwarted when the British authorities cautioned him not to intervene. In the same year, Dato Di Gadong shot several people for also refusing to join his revolution, further tainting the rebellion's image.

In July 1901, attacks on the Birau area began, with the rebels targeting shops owned by Chinese merchants, resulting in four people killed and one hundred families robbed during the killing. With at least two hundred families fleeing into Sarawak, seeing no hope in Brunei.

== Aftermath ==
While most rebels received amnesty from the Bruneian authorities, Dato Di Gadong and Dato Kalam of Limau Manis were left out with their coercion tactics during the rebellion and fled to Limbang, where they were found guilty of stealing carabao. When Dato Di Gadong returned to Tutong illegally in 1902, the Sultan ordered his death for many murders during the rebellion.
