= Early Bruneian conquests =

14th century Bruneian conquest

Date	1304–1371
Location	Borneo
Territorial changes	Expansion of Bruneian territory all the way to Pontianak

Belligerents
Brunei Kingdom and client states; Bruneian allies: Sea Dayaks (Note: Referred as simply "Dayaks"); Malaccan Sultanate (Note: After 1371)	Melanau Empire; Malaccan Sultanate; Majapahit; several other states

Commanders and leaders
Awang Alak Betatar (Note: Muhammad Shah after 1363); Pateh Berbai; Awang Jerambak; Awang Semuan; Pateh Damang Sari; Parameswara	Basiung; Tugau; Parameswara (until 1363)

The Early Bruneian conquests was period of conquest between the Brunei kingdom led by Awang Alak Betatar and the various states of Borneo.

== Background ==
The Majapahit empire according to the Nagarakretagama.

At the beginning, Melanau and Brunei were both subjects of the Majapahit Empire. A number of regions, including "Kadangdangan, Landa Samedang, Tirem, Sedu, Barune(ng), Kalaka, Saludung, Solot, Pasir Barito, Sawaku, Tabulang, Tajung Kuteri, and Malano," were vassals of the Majapahit, according to the old Nagarakretagama record. As the Majapahit Empire collapsed, Brunei seized the chance to increase its power and set its sights on the Tutong River region. Pembakal Bangis, a Bruneian nobleman, was chosen by Awang Alak Betatar to make the request that Mawangga, the Tutong chief, show up at the capital. Mawangga responded, however, that he and his people were conquered slaves, ruled by the Melanau leaders Basiung and his in-law Tugau, who resided in Igan, and that they could not submit.

Tutong in modern day, Brunei Darussalam.

Mawangga told Pembakal Bangis that Tutong would surrender to the authority of the Bruneian ruler, if the great Brunei commander, Awang Alak Betatar, ordered his soldiers to proceed to Igan. Awang Alak Betatar's demand was communicated to Basiung. However, Basiung was not pleased and was used to people approaching him. In response, Basiung suggested that Awang Alak Betatar pay him a visit instead, threatening to launch an Igan attack on Brunei if there was any delay. Bangis told Basiung nine days to make up his mind, but Basiung was unfazed and declared that he would make sure Awang Alak Betatar did not hurt him if he showed up on time with presents. Awang Alak Betatar and his ministers, Awang Semaun, Awang Jeramabak, and Pateh Damang Sari, were offended by Basiung's reply and chose to attack Igan to establish their authority.

== War ==
The first battle between Brunei and foreign armies was the Sarawakian Igan Valley. The Igan River flowed through this valley and was located in the traditional lands of the Melanau-speaking people. There are two accounts of the fight: the first, more legendary, tells of a nine-month struggle between three Brunei heroes and Bilanapura, a genie that Jerambak finally defeated using a miraculous fish skin he stole from an ogre. According to the second, the Brunei forces left Brunei and met their foes Basiung and his forces from Igan. Basiung had help from his allies from Sambas, Matu, Sadung and Sarikei. Basiung had assembled more than 9,000 soldiers at Igan. However, the 9,000 soldiers were no match for the soldiers from Brunei. They attacked in their hundreds, thousands, tens of thousands. Thousands died, as the King had the Dayaks on their sides, forcing the Melanau to flee, making Basiung, with a few followers, made his escape by boat, and sailed down coast as fast as he could to get back to his brother-in-law at Rutus, report his failure, and raise the country.

Basiung reached the Rutus safely, but before he and Tugau could collect all their followers or send word to the neighbouring districts, Pateh Berbai and Awang Semaun, who had followed by sea from Tutong with all their people, were upon them. By the time the battle ended, Basiung and Tugau realized that they had lost. Houses were burnt, potteries were smashed and there were lots of war treasures captured by the Brunei forces. Awang Jerambak called on Igan to acknowledge the over lordship of Awang Alak Betatar as the new power.

The Brunei forces went on to plunder and conquer the rest of the historically Melanau areas of Oya, Matu and Mukah. They also defeated the allies of Igan including Sarikei, Rajang, Sadung, Sarawak, Tanjung Datu and Lingga. They went all the way to Sambas thus conquering Sambas, Pontianak and Sanggau thus conquering the South and Southwestern Part of the Borneo Island.

The Brunei Forces also defeated and conquered territories on the east coast of Borneo such as Banjar (today Banjarmasin) as well as territories over the north of Borneo Island. The Brunei conquests over the north of Borneo took a much longer time. This is not because the forces there were much stronger but unlike Melanau which was a dominant military centre, the territories in old Sabah were scattered. Brunei forces had to attack more than 20 times on about 15 different territories. Their foes included the Bajaus, Ilanuns, Bugis, Suluks and Dusuns as a result, Igan was destroyed and war spoils were taken. Following this, Jerambak made Igan accept Awang Alak Betatar's dominance. Awang Alak Betatar expanded the newly established Brunei territory by advancing his frontiers from the Tutong River to the Rejang river delta.

According to Chinese historical accounts, including "Nan Hai Zhi, Volume 7," Brunei ruled over nine regions in the 13th and 14th centuries, which is consistent with the Syair Awang Semaun. It describes how Awang Alak Betatar expanded his domain to include Sungai Igan and then took five more provinces from Malacca on Borneo's west coast: Sarawak, Samarahan, Sadong, Mukah, and Kalaka. With the acquisition, Brunei's colonial territories became a total of 14.

Brunei also later went on to conquer the territories in modern day, Sabah, which were scattered. Brunei forces had to attack more than twenty times on about fifteen different territories. Their foes included the Bajaus, Ilanuns, Bugis, Suluks and Dusuns.

The territories that were conquered or acknowledged Brunei's authority included Kuala Panyu, Membakut, Bungawan, Kimanis, Binunih, Papar, Putatan, Manggatal, Tuaran, Sulaman, Ranau, Tampasuk, Lingkabu, Kinabatangan, Tungku, Silam, Bulungan, Kuran, Sandungan, Mutu, Banjar. In addition, the Brunei forces also captured or had territories that acknowledged Brunei which included Simbatu, Papan, Rantungan, Lantay and Oti in Sulawesi.

== Aftermath ==
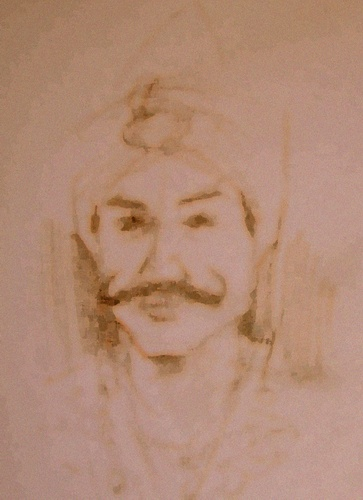
Illustration of Parameswara.

According to the Salasilah Raja-Raja Brunei, 'Royal Genealogy of Brunei' (Manuscript 9B), upon Sultan Muhammad Shah's ascension as the first Sultan of Brunei, he was bestowed with many lands by the Yang Di-Pertuan of Malacca, including Kalaka, Saribas, Semarahan, Sarawak, and Mukah. Theorising that the Melanau people's resistance to Brunei rule could account for the difference within the battle accounts and the gift from Iskander Shah, Dzulfawati Haji Hassan published her paper "Hubungan Melanau-Brunei" for the 10th Anniversary of Universiti Brunei Darussalam in 1996. In defiance of Brunei's invasions and conquests, the Melanau sided with Parameswara and revolted. However, these states were eventually restored to Brunei after Sultan Muhammad Shah wed a princess of Malacca.

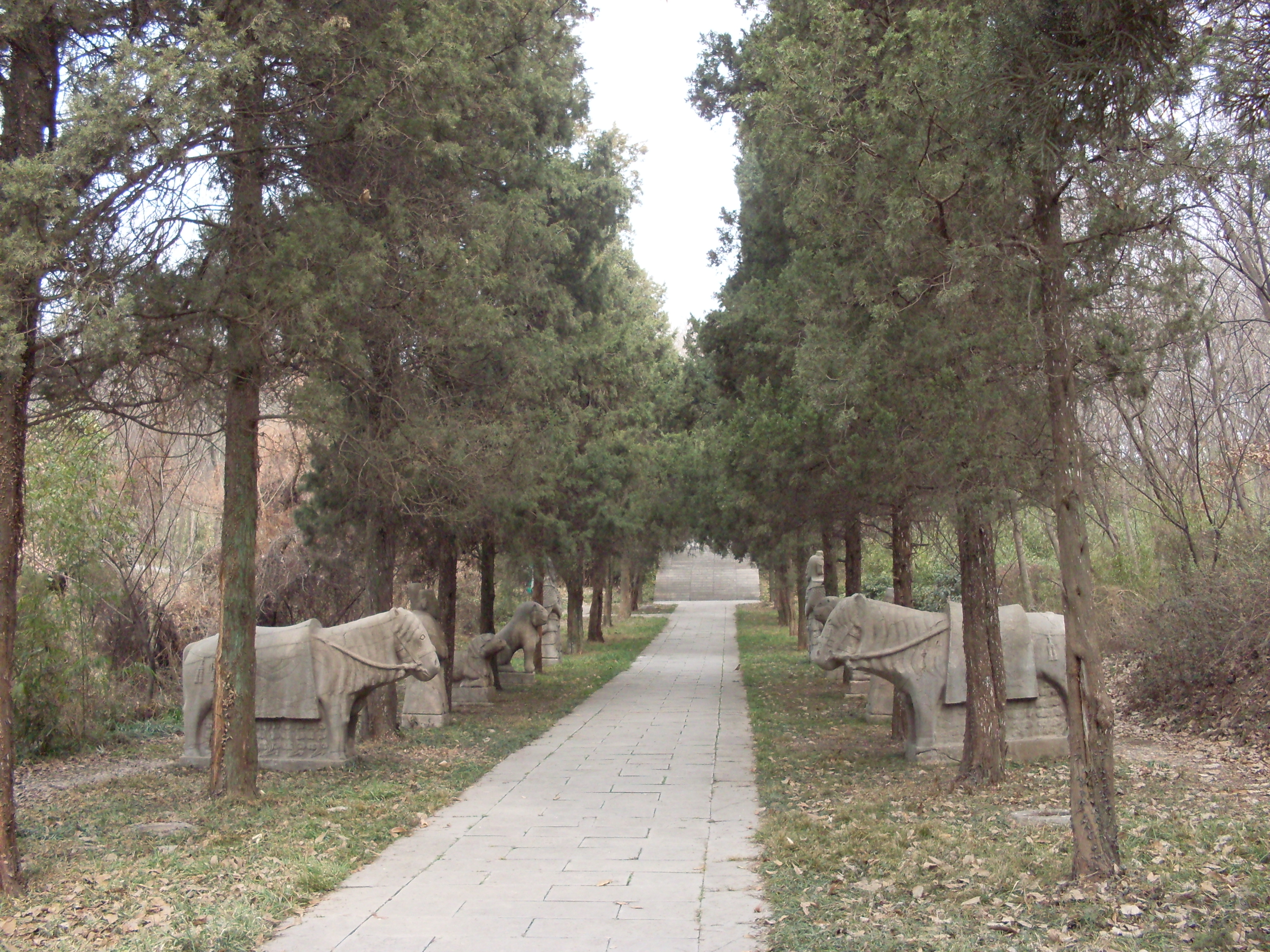
The Tomb of the King of Boni in Nanjing, Jiangsu, China

.

Local customs, recorded in the Syair Awang Semaun and the Salasilah Raja-Raja Brunei, state that Awang Alak Betatar turned to Islam to marry Puteri Dayang Pingai, the daughter of the Sultan of Malacca. While archeological data points to Brunei's emergence in the 10th century, some historians of Brunei have placed this event as early as 1368 (Jamil Al-Sufri 1997), which has come to be accepted as the official date of the sultanate's Islamic conversion, though there is still room for disagreement. Early on under Sultan Muhammad Shah's rule, Brunei was required to pay tribute to China as well as Java. This time frame matched the Ming Dynasty's ascent to power in 1368, following the fall of the Yuan Dynasty.

Awang Alak Betatar's conversion of the Malay Hindu-Buddhist monarchy of Brunei to Islam transformed its religious landscape. However, because of the strong Hindu-Buddhist influence, Islam had not yet thoroughly permeated Bruneian society in the immediate wake of his conversion. According to Mahmud Saedon in 2003, Islamic missionary activities also had not established a solid foundation at that point. Despite this, evidence also suggests that the present-day region of Brunei was home to an Islamic presence before to the establishment of the Sultanate, as well as a pre-existing Muslim monarchy.

== Sources ==
- Yunos, Rozan (2010). The Early Brunei Conquests. The Brunei Times.
- Haji Abdul Karim bin Haji Abdul Rahman (2016-04-04). Sejarah Pengasasan Dan Asal Usul Kerajaan Brunei Berdasarkan Sumber Lisan (PDF) (PhD thesis) (in Malay). Universiti Malaya.
