= Pandasan Affair =

1915 rebellion in North Borneo

Date	23–26 April 1915
Location	Tempassuk District, North Borneo 6.466461754682526°N 116.53330563001516°E

Belligerents
North Borneo Chartered Company	Pandasan rebels

Commanders and leaders
(North Borneo) E. H. Barraut; (North Borneo) D. R. Maxwell; (North Borneo) P. C. Brackenbury; (North Borneo) Jemadar Raidulah Khan	Sharif Ali; Aki Kulindod; Bongol; Sharif Musdoki

Units involved
British North Borneo Constabulary	

Casualties and losses
1x killed	18x – 23x killed

The Pandasan Affair (Pindasan or Pindassan) known more locally as the Pandasan Uprising, or the Pandasan War (Malay: Perang Pandasan) was an armed uprising of several Bajau, Illanun, and Dusun tribes against the North Borneo Chartered Company which took place largely in the kampung of Pandasan and the Northwest reaches of North Borneo (present day Sabah), around the Tempassuk District and Marudu Bay. The leader of the Pandasan rebel movement was Sharif Ali, brother of the famous deceased warrior Mat Salleh, who had led the Mat Salleh Rebellion.

== History ==
=== Background ===
In 1914, a government clerk in the employment of the North Borneo Chartered Company committed fraud against the Company, intentionally falsifying the payment receipt of the poll tax which had been levied on the population of Kota Marudu, a town on Marudu Bay. When the shortfall of the total collection was noticed, the clerk accused the indigenous leadership of Kota Marudu, and called them untrustworthy. With the government inclined to believe their own clerk, government administrator D. R. Maxwell, under orders from the Governor of North Borneo, prosecuted against those believed responsible.

A Bajau man named Sharif Ali (also known as Embo Ali or Sabil Ali) was wrongfully convicted of non-payment of the poll tax. At Marudu Bay, he tried to convince his neighbors to take up arms against the Company. Aki Kulindod did join with Sharif Ali here at Kota Marudu and they attempted to launch a revolution, but they couldn't attract enough followers. They did, however, manage to attract a small band, which was shortly transformed into the bones of a rebel militia.

In 1915, Sharif Ali moved with his followers away from the coast and into the jungles, setting up their rebel headquarters in the town of Pandasan. Along the way, they gathered more members from the area between Maurudu Bay and Tuaran. Among his new lieutenants was Bongol, the son of Si Gunting, the famous warrior who had rebelled against the government during the Sigunting War.

The area of Pandasan at the time, after a long drought, was filled with general discontent about the Company's recent land settlement, and the population had become angered by the tax on tapai which had recently been imposed. Along the Tuaran River, there had been many prosecutions for nonpayment of the tapai tax, and these people had faced a fine of, or several days in prison. The Headman had attempted to lodge his complaints with the government, but he was ignored. The Dusun community leaders of Pandasan were also given a fine of $25 if the forest was cleared without a permit, and were also greatly disgruntled with the outcomes of the 1913 Plantation Act.

Around the same time that these events were occurring in the Northwest of North Borneo, another much larger rebellion was happening in the South, called the Rundum Rebellion. Sharif Ali and his followers realized that with the government sufficiently distracted by the several thousand Murut there, they had also sent most of the staffed garrisons down to Rundum to reinforce the units there. They realized that this was enough that they might successfully win their own rebellion. Between 100 and 200 men comprised the force, and they made preparations to attack the government stations at Kota Belud and Tuaran.

=== Pandasan War ===
The first report of armed men in Penampang came in via the Company-appointed Headman, Tuajak, on 17 April 1915. 6 armed men had come to the town, recruiting for the rebel cause. A native member of the British North Borneo Constabulary named Rusoh also reported that was asked if he might join the rebels, and reported this to his commanders. The government ordered 10 additional officers to Penampang, but they would not arrive until the 22nd. By the time the unit had departed, the rebels had already left Penampang and were making their way up to Keguraan.

On 22 April 1915, 150 men gathered in Pendasan, armed themselves, and sent off units to start their campaign.

On 23 April, the first battle of the war occurred in Kota Belud between the rebels and a small force of the Constabulary serving under District Officer P. C. Brackenbury.

On 24 April, Resident E. H. Barraut set off from Jesselton with a detachment of the Constabulary under Jemadar Raidulah Khan along the Gantisan road towards Tuaran with 19 men to collect reinforcements. He took with him the entire Constabulary garrison at Tuaran, putting the total number of the Constabulary detachment at about 40 men in total. On 25 April, Barraut advanced towards Kota Belud, collecting intelligence from Tuajak and Puak on Sharif Ali's movements.

On 26 April, while Barraut's detachment was marching towards Pandasan, Sharif Ali's men were marching in the opposite direction towards Mamukan. The two armies halted 300 yards from each other and held their ground for some time. The rebels did not surrender when the Company-appointed Chief of Kota Belud, Hj Arshad, tried to persuade them to do so. Arshad called out to them to lay down their weapons, but they did not.

The rebels, dressed entirely in white, advanced slowly – rhythmically stamped on the ground with their spears thrust out in front of them. Arshad called out to them again to lay down their weapons, but they did not. There were 80 rebels, and only about 40 members of the Constabulary present, the rebels assumed that outnumbering the Constabulary 2 to 1 gave them the advantage, so they kept marching.

Barraut ordered the detachment to open fire. It took seven full volleys of rifle fire to break the advance of the rebels, and they had advanced to within only a few feet of the Constabulary. They did break, and Barraut ordered his men to fire at will. By the end of the battle, between 18 and 23 rebels had been killed, including Sharif Ali and Bongol. The rest of the rebels then fled the area.

After the battle, Barraut ordered more police to the area and seized all property belonging to the rebels. Oral histories of the region refer to Arshad as "being possessed by the Devil," and becoming almost like a dictator in the area after the hostilities had ended, ensuring that Company rule reigned supreme.
