= HMS Vixen =

Five ships of the Royal Navy have borne the name HMS Vixen, the term for a female Fox:

- HMS Vixen (1801) was a 14-gun gun-brig launched in 1801 and sold in 1815.
- HMS Vixen (1841) was a wood paddle sloop launched in 1841 and sold in 1862.
- HMS Vixen (1865) was an armoured composite gunboat launched in 1865 and ordered to be broken up in 1895.
- HMS Vixen (1900) was a destroyer launched in 1900, reclassified as a C-class destroyer in 1913 and sold in 1921.
- HMS Vixen (R64) was a V-class destroyer launched in 1943. She was transferred to the Royal Canadian Navy in 1944 and renamed HMCS Sioux. She was converted into a frigate in 1959 and was broken up in 1965.
