= Sultanate of Brunei (1368–1888) =

Malay sultanate centred in Brunei

Sultanate of Brunei كسلطانن بروني (Jawi) Kesultanan Brunei (Rumi)
- 1368–1888 (Note: De facto independent until 1906)
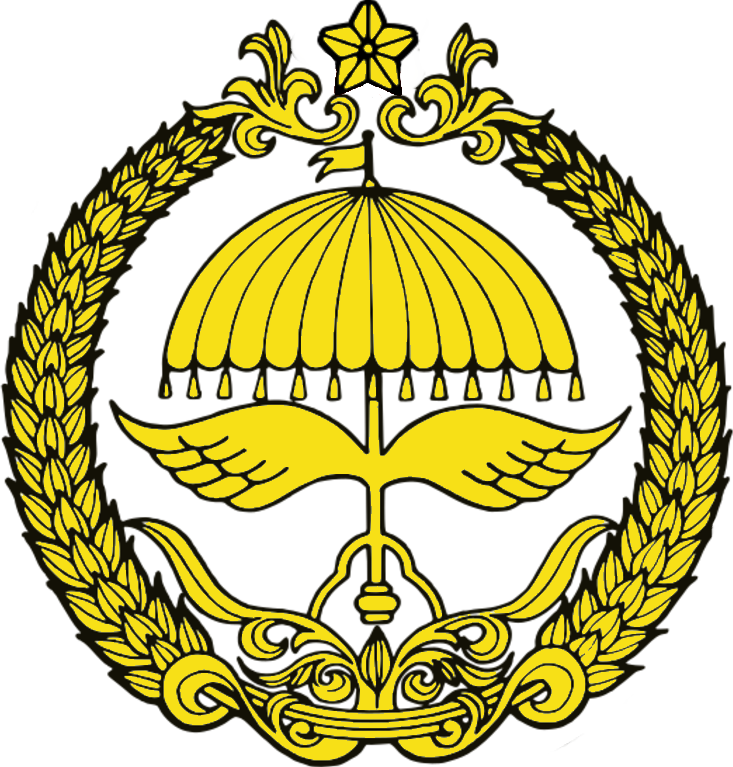
- Flag Royal Emblem (1852–1885)

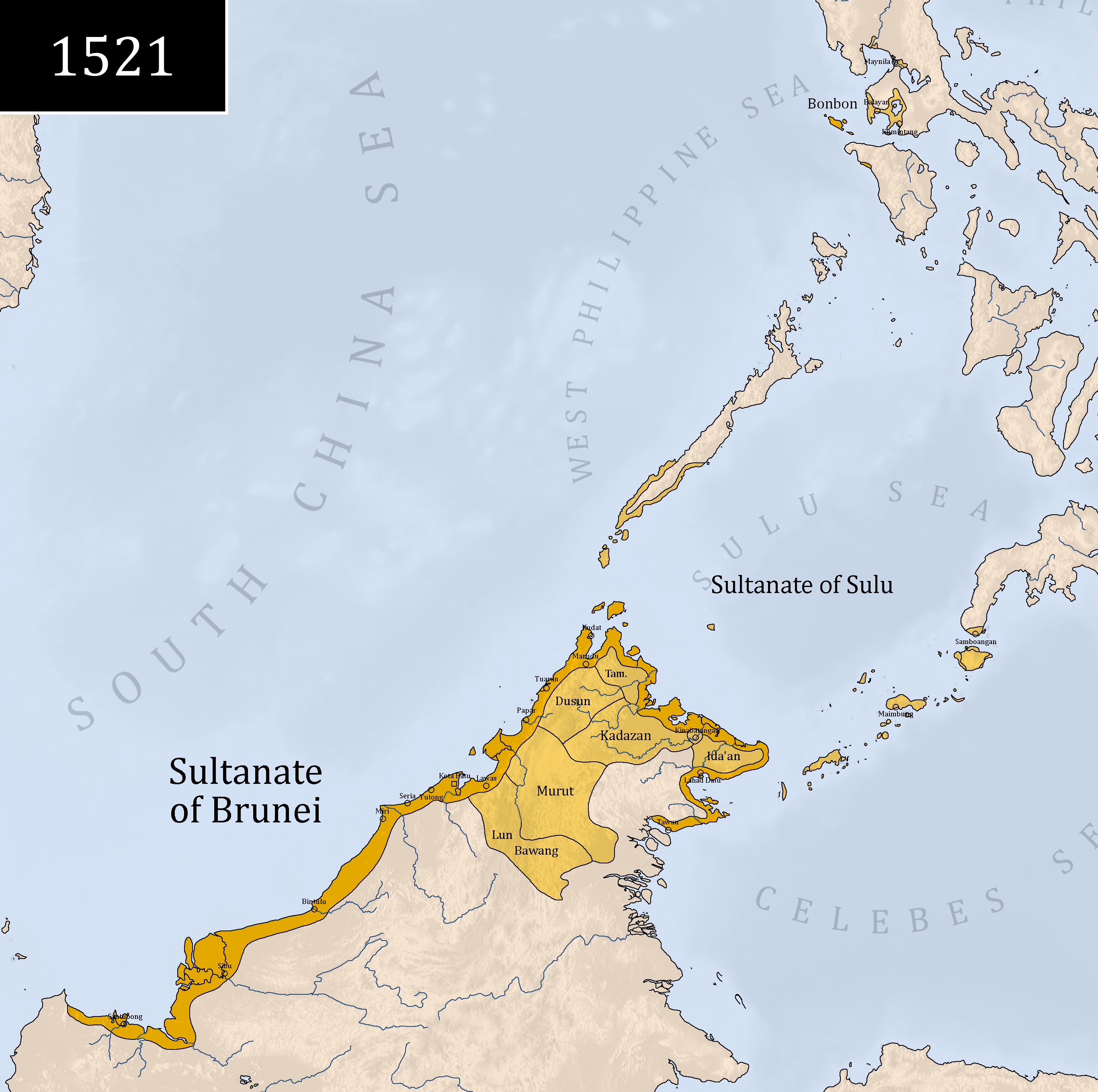
- The territorial extent of the Bruneian Empire (yellow) with its vassals (light yellow) in 1521 under Sultan Bolkiah
- Status: Vassal of Majapahit (Note: de facto independent) (1369–1402); Sovereign state (1402–1888)
- Capital: Kota Batu (1368–1660); Brunei Town, Kampong Ayer (1660–1920)
- Official languages: Brunei Malay; Quranic Arabic
- Common languages: Old Malay (Note: Before the 14th century); Bornean languages Dusunic languages Apo Duat languages Bazaar Malay; Southern Chinese dialects and more...
- Religion: Sunni Islam
- Demonym: Bruneian
- Government: Monarchy
- Sultans
  - 1363/1368–1402: Sultan Muhammad Shah
  - 1425–1432: Sharif Ali
  - 1485–1524: Bolkiah
  - 1582–1598: Muhammad Hassan
  - 1828–1852: Omar Ali Saifuddin II
  - 1885–1888: Hashim Jalilul Alam Aqamaddin
- History
  - Early Bruneian conquests: 1368
  - Establishment of the Sultanate: 1402
  - Became a British protectorate: 1888 (Note: De facto independent until 1906)
- Currency: Barter, Cowrie, Piloncitos, and later Brunei pitis
Preceded by
Majapahit
Succeeded by
Brunei
North Borneo
Crown Colony of Labuan
Raj of Sarawak
Dutch East Indies
Spanish East Indies
Sultanate of Sulu
Kingdom of Marudu
Ellena colony
Austrian North Borneo
- Today part of: Brunei; Indonesia; Malaysia; Philippines

The Sultanate of Brunei (Malay: Kesultanan Brunei, Jawi: كسلطانن بروني) or simply Brunei (/bruːˈnaɪ/ broo-NY), also known as the Bruneian Empire, was a Malay sultanate centred around Brunei on the northern coast of Borneo in Southeast Asia. Brunei became a sovereign state around the 15th century, when it substantially expanded after the fall of Malacca to the Portuguese, extending throughout coastal areas of Borneo and the Philippines, before it declined in the 17th and 18th centuries. It became a British protectorate in the 19th century.

== Historiography ==
The limited evidence from contemporary sources poses a challenge in understanding the history of the early Bruneian Sultanate. No local or indigenous sources exist to provide evidence for this. As a result, Chinese texts have been relied on to construct the history of early Brunei. Boni in Chinese sources most likely refers to Western Borneo, while Poli (婆利), probably located in the Aceh region in Sumatra, is claimed by local authorities to refer to Brunei as well.

== History ==
=== Pre-sultanate history ===
A renegade group from the kingdom of Funan in Cambodia found themselves in Borneo after escaping the Khmer invasion, which is where Brunei's historical roots lie. In honor of its ruler, Raja Kamrun, the early Arab explorers called this new country Kamrun. This name changed throughout time to become Muja, Zabaj, and finally Brunei. The history of the area was also affected by Srivijaya, from which rulers and their supporters fled to Brunei after Raja Sailendra conquered it. When these migrants took over Kamrun, the native population was forced to flee into the interior, which may have resulted in the rise of the Lun Bawang and Bisaya peoples.

The national history of Brunei alleges that Brunei is an ancient kingdom located in the Malay Archipelago, alongside other historical kingdoms such as Palembang Tua, Tarumanagara, Perlak, Pasai, Malacca, Gersik, and Demak. During the Song dynasty, a polity in western Borneo called Boni was noted as a large and powerful state, ruling over 14 regions and boasting 100 warships. The people were known for their bravery in battle, wielding swords and spears, and wearing armour made of copper for protection against enemy attacks.

Rice cultivation was the main source of income for the people of Brunei, whose land was said to be extremely productive. Some also fished and reared chickens and goats. In addition to many other handicrafts, the ladies were adept at weaving fabric, creating mats, and constructing baskets. The capital of Brunei, which had around 10,000 residents, was encircled by wooden defences. Like the people's dwellings, the royal palace was covered with nipa palm leaves.

In 977, a Chinese merchant of Arab descent named P'u-lu-shieh (Fairuz Shah) arrived in Brunei for trade, receiving a warm welcome from the king and the local populace. Upon his return to China, the King requested P'u-lu-shieh to escort his envoy to the Chinese Emperor. P'u-lu-shieh agreed, and the royal delegation was led by Abu Ali (Pu Ya Li), Syeikh Noh (Shih-Nu), and Qadi Kasim (Koh-shin). They brought letters and gifts for the emperor, including 100 turtle shells, camphor, five pieces of agarwood, three trays of sandalwood, raksamala wood, and six elephant tusks. The letter included three main points: to inform the Emperor about P'u-lu-shieh's arrival in Brunei and his assistance in repairing the damaged ship; to send envoys to the Emperor as representatives, offering gifts on behalf of the king; and to request the Emperor's assistance in notifying the Champa government to ensure the safety of Brunei's ships stranded there due to storms. Since that time, the relationship between Brunei and China became increasingly close and friendly.

Known as the "Maritime Silk Road" or "spice road," Brunei's commerce networks were essential in linking it to other areas. As evidence of Brunei's early engagement in foreign affairs, King Hiang-ta of P'oni dispatched an embassy to China in 977. Brunei's historical significance is demonstrated by the fact that it was referred to by names like P'oli and P'oni during the Liang, Sui, Tang, Song, and Ming dynasties. In the Temburong District in particular, the term P'oni is still used today. In addition, the family of Awang Alak Betatar is thought to have established the old monarchy in Garang before moving to Kota Batu in 1397.

In the 14th century, Brunei seems to have been a subject of Java. The Javanese manuscript Nagarakretagama, written by Prapanca in 1365, mentioned Barune as the vassal state of Majapahit, which had to make an annual tribute of 40 katis of camphor.

After Majapahit invaded Brunei, its subject kingdoms in the Philippines which were formally under its control, rebelled against Brunei, chief of which was the former kingdom of Sulu which besieged and pillaged it.

Its (Brunei's) own empire gone, it would appear to have shrunk to its heartland by Brunei bay. It now paid an annual tribute of 40 kati of camphor to the Majapahit Emperor. But worse was to follow. 1369 marks the absolute nadir of Brunei's fortunes, for in that year its former subjects the Suluks put it to sack. So utterly helpless were the Bruneis, that they had to be rescued by the Majapahit fleet, which drove out the intruders, who departed laden with enormous booty and taking the two precious pearls.

— Robert Nicholl, "Brunei Rediscovered: A Survey of Early Times"

Later, China's Ming dynasty freed Brunei from paying tribute to Majapahit, which in 1407 had been pressured by a show of force into apologising for killing Ming soldiers. Bruneian royalty visited China in 1408, and the Chinese emperor performed an investiture for Brunei's new ruler.

=== Expansion ===
After the fall of Malacca to the Portuguese, Portuguese merchants traded regularly with Brunei from 1530 and described the capital of Brunei as surrounded by a stone wall. During the rule of Bolkiah, the fifth sultan, the sultanate controlled the coastal areas of northwest Borneo (present-day Brunei, Sarawak and Sabah) and reached Seludong (present-day Serudong River, Sabah) as well as the Sulu Archipelago.

During Bolkiah's reign, Brunei's influence extended to the southern Philippines, including Taguima (Basilan). The Tagimaha (Yakan) of Basilan were among the Sultan's most trusted naval allies, providing vessels and warriors for regional expeditions, reflecting Brunei's maritime reach across the Sulu Sea and its political and dynastic connections with Sulu and neighbouring coastal polities.

In the 16th century, the Brunei's influence extended as far as the Kapuas River delta in West Kalimantan. The Malay Sultanate of Sambas in West Kalimantan and the Sultanate of Sulu in the southern Philippines in particular developed dynastic relations with the royal house of Brunei. The Malay sultans of Pontianak, Samarinda and Banjarmasin, treated the Sultan of Brunei as their leader. The true nature of Brunei's relationship with other Malay sultanates of coastal Borneo and the Sulu Archipelago is still a subject of study, as to whether it was a vassal state, an alliance, or just a ceremonial relationship. Other regional polities also exercised their influence upon these sultanates. The Sultanate of Banjar (present-day Banjarmasin), for example, was also under the influence of Demak in Java. The growth of Malacca as the largest Southeast Asian entrepôt in the Maritime Silk Road led to a gradual spread of its cultural influence eastward throughout Maritime Southeast Asia. Malay became the regional lingua franca of trade and many polities enculturated Islamic Malay customs and governance to varying degrees, including Kapampangans, Tagalogs and other coastal Philippine peoples. Brunei gained influence in Luzon after the marriage of Salalila to the daughter of Sultan Bolkiah of Brunei and Puteri Laila Menchanai of Sulu, creating a union between the royal houses of Maynila, Brunei and Sulu. This union facilitated the spread of Islam in the coastal parts of central and southern Luzon. The Muslim rajahs of Maynila, like Rajah Matanda, for instance, had family-links with the Brunei Sultanate, as he was the grandson of Sultan Bolkiah.

Bruneian influence spread elsewhere around Manila Bay, present-day Batangas, and coastal Mindoro through closer trade and political relations, with a growing overseas Kapampangan-Tagalog population based in Brunei and beyond in Malacca in various professions as traders, sailors, shipbuilders, mercenaries, governors, and slaves.

=== Decline ===
Bruneian territorial losses from 1400 to 1890.

The rising power of the nearby Sultanate of Sulu occurred due to infighting between Bruneian nobles and the king. Brunei eventually lost its authority over the Bajaus and lapsed into a collection of riverine territories ruled by semi-autonomous chiefs. By the end of 17th century, Brunei entered a period of decline brought on by internal strife over royal succession, colonial expansion of European powers, and piracy. By 1725, Brunei had many of its supply routes to the Sultanate of Sulu. However despite all of this pressure against them, they were not a state of decline like that of the Ottomans as the Sultans of Sulu still paid tribute, with Brunei humiliating the Sulu in the Apostate War which lasted to 1769 until 1790. True collapse only happened in 1836 when the Bau region ruled Pengiran Indera Mahkota was in full revolt.

Brunei lost much of its territory due to the arrival of the western powers such as the Spanish in the Philippines, James Brooke in Sarawak, the British in Labuan and the Americans in North Borneo which was later given to the Germans and British.

In 1888, Sultan Hashim Jalilul Alam Aqamaddin appealed to the British to stop further encroachment. In the same year, the British signed a protectorate agreement with Brunei and made Brunei a British protectorate. After the agreement however, the Padas Damit War began after a Bruneian nobleman disputed with the North Borneo Company ending in 1889.

The protectorate lasted until 1984, when Brunei gained independence.

== Government ==
The sultanate was divided into three traditional land systems known as kerajaan (crown property), kuripan (official property) and tulin (hereditary private property).

== Historical accounts ==
=== Arab narratives ===
Arab travellers who explored the Malay Archipelago referred to Brunei as "Ka Selatangaz”. It is located to the east of Java and southwest of Luzon. Other Arab explorers called it "Zabaj" or "Zabaji," indicating a land known for producing camphor. Zabaj or Zabaji is said to be situated near the Thousand Islands in the Philippines. Ahmad ibn Majid, a notable Arab navigator who sailed through the Malay Archipelago, referred to Zabaj or Zabaji as "Barni," which corresponds to Brunei. Additionally, the South China Sea, which they navigated en route to China, was also named "Laut Barni" or "Brunei Sea."

The Arab explorers described Brunei's capital as a city built on water, with a hot climate which experienced tidal changes twice a day. They noted the presence of peacocks, monkeys, and talking cockatoos, which sported feathers in white, red, and yellow. The region was rich in natural resources, producing camphor, gold, spices, nutmeg, and sandalwood. The Arab travellers also recognised Brunei as a significant kingdom within the Malay Archipelago, boasting a strong military presence. Its naval bases were strategically located at crucial river estuaries, commanded by a Pengiran and his followers, who were responsible for maintaining the safety and security of the people and the state.

Most of Brunei's population resided around Brunei Bay, engaging in various occupations such as fishing and farming, while others became skilled sailors, brave warriors, and successful traders. According to Arab explorers, Brunei's port was safe, sheltered, and prosperous, attracting merchants from diverse backgrounds, including those from China, Java, Siam, Palembang, Kelantan, Pahang, Cambodia, Makassar, Pattani, and Suluk. During this period, the goods traded at Brunei's port included camphor, gemstones, wax, honey, pearls, gold, spices, pottery, silk, tin, rattan, and various foodstuffs. The bustling trade and the wide variety of goods exchanged at the port underscore Brunei's significance in the region's commerce and its connections with different cultures.

=== Chinese narratives ===
The histories of the Liang, Sui, Tang, and Song dynasties all indicate that Brunei and China had a cordial connection. Both kingdoms' kings often dispatched envoys from their respective areas with gifts and messages. At the same time, traders also came to the ports of both kingdoms to do business. Brunei–China relations deteriorated during the Yuan dynasty. Chinese rulers of the period prioritized war and territory conquest. Under Kublai Khan's leadership, a military expedition headed by General Su P'e was sent to the Malay Archipelago in 1292 AD with the goal of attacking many nations, including Brunei. But the invading army were effectively repulsed by Brunei's soldiers. Feeling embarrassed to go back home, the vanquished Chinese troops asked the King of Brunei for permission to reside in the Kinabatangan valley, which is part of Sabah and is governed by Brunei. They founded a hamlet there when the King accepted their request.

According to the histories of the Ming dynasty, in 1370, a Chinese Emperor's ambassador on his way to Java made a halt in Brunei. The King of Brunei was titled Mahamosa, which is taken from the Chinese pronunciation of Sultan Muhammad Shah, according to this mission, which was headed by Sin Tze and Chang Ching Tze. According to Sin Tze the monarch was bold, powerful, and furious. But he also stated that Brunei's defences were weakened because of the Suluk people's annihilation. Because of Brunei's poverty and continued tribute to Majapahit, Muhammad Shah was hesitant to follow Sin Tze's advice to seek protection from China and to deliver tribute. The Sultan eventually decided to send an embassy to China after being convinced by the envoy's logical arguments. Alongside the Chinese ambassador returning from Java in 1371, his delegation set ship for China.

Under the reign of Hongwu, the relationship between Brunei and China strengthened further. In 1375, a royal prince from China named Ong Sum Ping visited Brunei and eventually married Princess Ratna Dewi, the daughter of Muhammad Shah, earning the title Pengiran Maharaja Lela. Ong's brother also married Pengiran Bendahara Pateh Berbai. In 1397, during the reign of Jiawen, an envoy from Muhammad Shah visited China along with envoys from Annam, Siam, Java, Palembang, and Pahang. This time, the Brunei delegation was officially recognized as representing Brunei rather than P'oni, as the kingdom had relocated to Kota Batu. In 1402, the reigning king was Manajekana, also known as Sultan Abdul Majid. In 1403, the Sultan sent an envoy to inform the emperor of his father's death. By 1405, he dispatched another envoy to request formal recognition from the emperor, who was pleased to receive this honour. In the same year, the emperor sent an official delegation led by Cheng Ho to Brunei, bringing royal seals and gifts as a gesture of goodwill.

During Abdul Majid's rule, Brunei's ties with China grew stronger. On August 20, 1408, the Sultan travelled to China with a retinue of 150 family members. After two months in China, he fell ill and died at the age of 28 October 1408, with his remains interred on the slopes of a hill named Shih-tzu Kang in Nanking. To fulfill Sultan Abdul Majid's wishes, the Chinese emperor appointed Hsia-wang, the Sultan's son, as the King of Brunei. After spending a year in China, Hsia-wang returned to Brunei, escorted by Chinese officials led by Chong Chien. During Hsia-wang's absence, the throne was held by his uncle, Pateh Berbai, who took the title Sultan Ahmad, as Hsia-wang was only four years old at that time. Between 1415 and 1425, relations between Brunei and China remained stable, with Brunei sending four envoys to China during those years. However, after 1425, the relationship began to deteriorate, and it was not until 1530 that Brunei sent envoys to China again, alongside delegations from Siam, Champa, and Java.

=== European narratives ===
An Italian explorer, Antonio Pigafetta, stopped at Brunei in July 1521 on a return trip to Spain. He recorded that the Malays had been in Brunei for a long time and had a high level of civilization. Forts were built that mounted heavy guns and were equipped with horses and trained elephants. In the house of the Sultan, there were silver candlesticks and gold spoons on the table.

== See also ==
- Sultanate of Sambas
- Sultanate of Sarawak

== Sources ==
- Haji Abdul Karim bin Haji Abdul Rahman (4 April 2016). Sejarah Pengasasan Dan Asal Usul Kerajaan Brunei Berdasarkan Sumber Lisan (PDF) (PhD thesis) (in Malay). Universiti Malaya.
- Haji Mail, Haji Awang Asbol; Anwar, Zaidul (2016). "Sultan Muhammad Alam: Roles in Civil War". Jurnal Darussalam (in Malay). 16. Bandar Seri Begawan: Brunei History Centre, Ministry of Culture, Youth and Sports: 6–23.
- Holt, P. M.; Lambton, Ann K. S.; Lewis, Bernard (1977). The Cambridge History of Islam: Volume 2A, The Indian Sub-Continent, South-East Asia, Africa and the Muslim West. Cambridge University Press. ISBN 978-0-521-29137-8.
- Brunei Museum Journal (1986). The Brunei Museum Journal. Brunei Museum.
- McArthur, M.S.H.; Horton, A.V.M. (1987). Report on Brunei in 1904. Athens, Ohio: Ohio University Center for International Studies, Center for Southeast Asian Studies. ISBN 0-896-80135-7.
- Herbert, Patricia; Milner, Anthony Crothers (1989). South-East Asia: Languages and Literatures : a Select Guide. University of Hawaiʻi Press. ISBN 978-0-8248-1267-6.
- Jamil Al-Sufri; Awang Mohd. Zain (1990). Tarsilah Brunei: sejarah awal dan perkembangan Islam (in Malay). Brunei History Centre, Ministry of Culture, Youth and Sports.
- Juned, Abdul Aziz (1992). Islam di Brunei: zaman pemerintahan Kebawah Duli Yang Maha Mulia Paduka Seri Baginda Sultan Haji Hassanal Bolkiah Mu'izzuddin Waddaulah, Sultan dan Yang Di-Pertuan Negara Brunei Darussalam (in Malay). Brunei History Centre, Ministry of Culture, Youth and Sports.
- Lach, Donald F. (1994). Asia in the Making of Europe, Volume I: The Century of Discovery. University of Chicago Press. ISBN 978-0-226-46732-0.
- Jamil Al-Sufri, Awang Mohd. Zain (2000). Tarsilah Brunei: The Early History of Brunei Up to 1432 AD. Brunei History Centre, Ministry of Culture, Youth and Sports. ISBN 978-99917-34-03-3.
- Lea, David; Milward, Colette (2001). A Political Chronology of South-East Asia and Oceania. Psychology Press. ISBN 978-1-85743-117-9.
- Eur (2002). The Far East and Australasia 2003. Psychology Press. ISBN 978-1-85743-133-9.
- Bala, Bilcher (2005). Thalassocracy: a history of the medieval Sultanate of Brunei Darussalam. School of Social Sciences, Universiti Malaysia Sabah. ISBN 978-983-2643-74-6.
- Hicks, Nigel (2007). The Philippines. New Holland Publishers. ISBN 978-1-84537-663-5.
- Abdul Majid, Harun (2007). Rebellion in Brunei: The 1962 Revolt, Imperialism, Confrontation and Oil. I.B. Tauris. ISBN 978-1-84511-423-7.
- Abdul Latif, Muhammad; Hassan, Zainuddin (2007). "Kerajaan Awal Brunei". Pusaka Majalah (in Malay). 14. Brunei History Centre, Ministry of Culture, Youth and Sports.
- Yunos, Rozan (2008). "The Sultan who thwarted Rajah Brooke". The Brunei Times. Archived from the original on 30 September 2015.
- Suyatno (2008). "Naskah Nagarakretagama" (in Indonesian). National Library of Indonesia. Archived from the original on 23 May 2017.
- History for Brunei Darussalam: Sharing our Past. Curriculum Development Department, Ministry of Education of Brunei Darussalam. 2009. ISBN 978-99917-2-372-3.
- Sidhu, Jatswan S. (2009). Historical Dictionary of Brunei Darussalam. Scarecrow Press. ISBN 978-0-8108-7078-9.
- Hussainmiya, B. A. (2010). "The Malay Identity in Brunei Darussalam and Sri Lanka" (PDF). Universiti Brunei Darussalam. Archived from the original (PDF) on 29 October 2014.
- The Report: Sabah. Oxford Business Group. 2011. ISBN 978-1-907065-36-1.
- Church, Peter (2012). A Short History of South-East Asia. John Wiley & Sons. ISBN 978-1-118-35044-7.
- Saunders, Graham (2013). A History of Brunei. Taylor & Francis. ISBN 978-1-136-87401-7.
- Welman, Frans (2013). Borneo Trilogy Brunei: Vol 1. Booksmango. ISBN 978-616-222-235-1.
- Kurz, Johannes L. (2014). "Boni in Chinese Sources: Translations of Relevant Texts from the Song to the Qing Dynasties" (PDF). Universiti Brunei Darussalam. National University of Singapore. Archived from the original (PDF) on 22 May 2014.
- Andaya, Barbara Watson; Andaya, Leonard Y. (2015). A History of Early Modern Southeast Asia, 1400–1830. Cambridge University Press. ISBN 978-0-521-88992-6.
- CIA Factbook (2017). "The World Factbook – Brunei". Central Intelligence Agency. Archived from the original on 21 July 2015.
- "Brunei Darussalam". World Atlas. 2017. Archived from the original on 29 July 2020.
- Guillemard, Francis Henry Hill (1908). Volume 2 of Stanford's compendium of geography and travel - Malaysia and the Pacific Archipelagoes. Edward Stanford.
