= Henry Deshon =

British colonial administrator (1858–1924)

The Honourable Henry Deshon FRGS

Officer administering the Government of Sarawak
- In office 1903–1904
- Preceded by: Charles Agar Bampfylde
- Succeeded by: Sir Percy Francis Cunynghame

Resident of the First Division, Sarawak
- In office 1903–1904
- Preceded by: Charles Agar Bampfylde
- Succeeded by: Sir Percy Francis Cunynghame

Personal details
- Born: 24 April 1858 West Ashton, Wiltshire
- Died: 30 June 1924 (aged 66)
- Occupation: Colonial administrator

Henry FitzGibbon Deshon (24 April 1858 – 30 June 1924) was a British administrator serving in Sarawak and aide-de-camp to the Rajah, Charles Brooke.

== Early life and education ==
Deshon was born on 24 April 1858 at West Ashton, Wiltshire, the son Rev. H. C. Deshon, Vicar in Teignmouth, Devon. He was educated at Sidney College, Bath.

== Career ==
Deshon joined the Sarawak Administrative Service in 1876 as a cadet. Around 1880, he joined the personal staff of the Rajah as aide-de-camp. In 1881, he was appointed assistant Resident in charge of Batang Lupar District, and two years later promoted to Resident, a post he held until 1891. From 1894 to 1902, he served as Resident of the 4th Division and the 3rd Division, and finally, in 1903, as Resident of the 1st Division.

In June 1902, he commanded an expedition of 12,000 men that travelled up the Batang Lupar River in boats to punish head-hunters from Ulu Ai. The force was stricken by cholera before they could achieve their mission, and over 1,000 members of the expedition died.

Deshon served as personal aide-de-camp to the Rajah during most of his career. He accompanied him on his visits to England in 1883 and 1901. He served as president of the Sarawak Committee of Administration, and member of the Supreme Council. He was appointed officer administrating the Government during the absence the Rajah from 1903 to 1904. After retiring from the service later that year, he became political adviser to the Rajah in England. He was an elected member of the Royal Asiatic Society and Fellow of the Royal Geographical Society.

Deshon was selected as one of the four members, including the Rajah Muda, of the Advisory Council of the Sarawak State which was established in London by the Rajah in 1912 to oversee the finances of the State, and act as agents-general in communications with the Foreign Office on matters affecting Sarawak. When Brooke died in 1917, Deshon was mentioned as one of the two executors in his will. In 1924, he represented Sarawak as commissioner at the British Empire Exhibition.

== Personal life and death ==
Deshon married Nora, daughter of George Bird of the Madras Civil Service in 1889.

Deshon died on 30 June 1924, aged 66. Deshon Road in Kuching, is named after him.
