= List of heads of government of the Raj of Sarawak =

Flag of the Raj of Sarawak from 1870 to 1946.

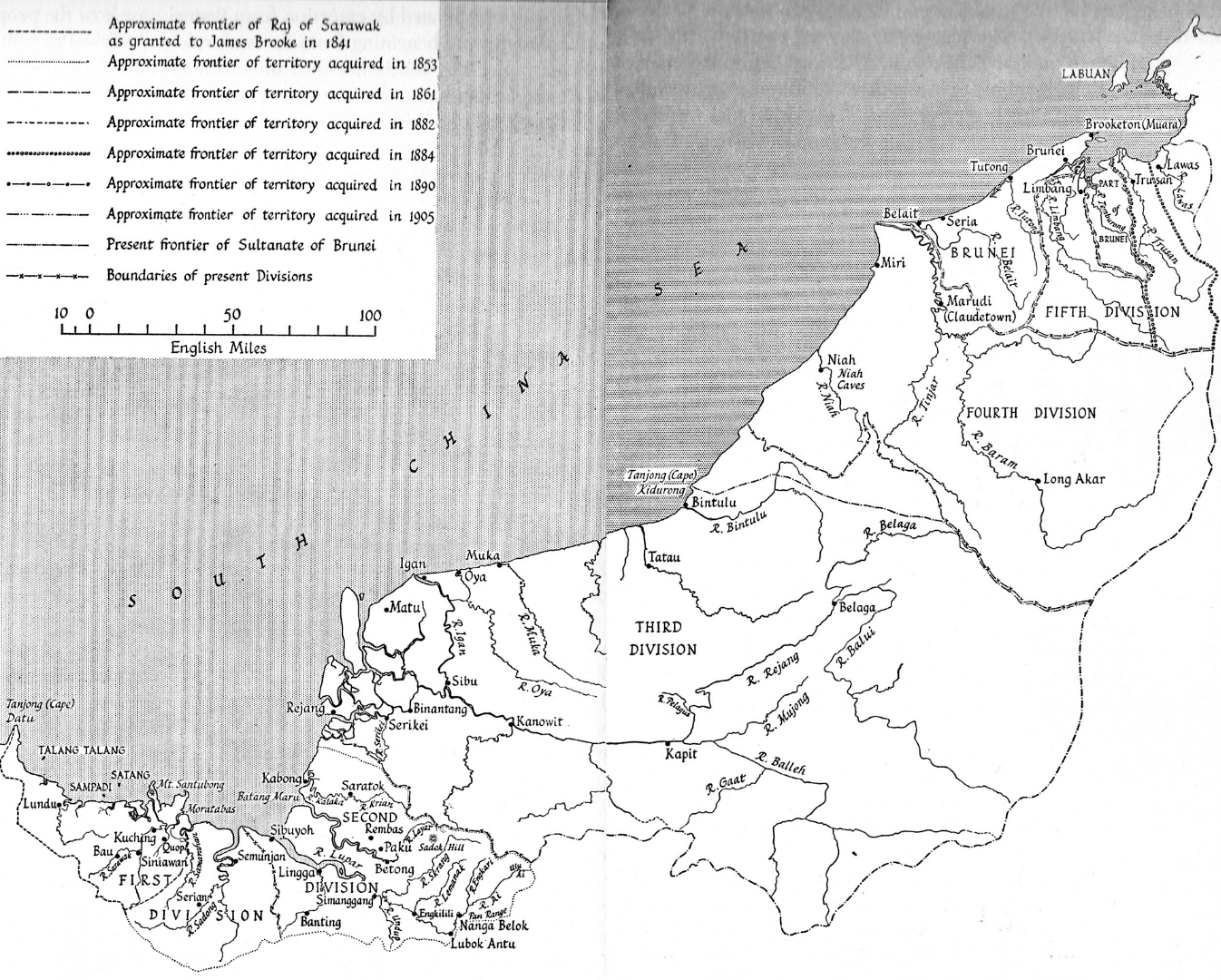
Map of the Raj of Sarawak, 1920s.

This article lists the heads of government of the Raj of Sarawak from 1843 to 1946, when the Raj of Sarawak was ceded to the United Kingdom and became the Crown Colony of Sarawak.

== List ==
(Dates in italics indicate de facto continuation of office)

No.	Portrait	Name	Term	Notes
Chief Minister
1		Thomas Williamson	1843–1846	
Resident
2		Arthur Chichester Crookshank	1863–1873	
Chairman of the Committee of Administration
3		William Maunder Crocker	1875–1880	
4		Francis Richard Ord Maxwell	1881–1895	Sarawak was made a British protectorate in 1888
5		Charles Agar Bampfylde	1896–1903	
6		Henry FitzGibbon Deshon	1903–1904	
7		Sir Percy Francis Cunynghame	1904–1909	
8		Harry Robert Arbuthnot Day	1909–1910	
9		Ivone Kirkpatrick-Caldecott	1910–1915	
10		Arthur Bartlett Ward	1915–1923	
Chief Secretary and Chairman of the Committee of Administration
11		John Coney Moulton	1923–1926	
12		Harold Brooke Crocker	1927–1928	
13		Charles Vyner Brooke	1928–1930	1st time. Simultaneously reigned as the White Rajah
14		Francis Farrington Boult	1930	
		James Colin Swayne	1930	1st time, acting
(13)		Charles Vyner Brooke	1930–1931	2nd time. Simultaneously reigned as the White Rajah
		James Colin Swayne	1931–1932	2nd time, acting
15		Charles Macaskie	1932–1934	Government secretary
(13)		Charles Vyner Brooke	1934–1937	3rd time. Simultaneously reigned as the White Rajah
16		Edward Parnell	1937–1939	
17		John Beville Archer	1939–1941	1st time
18		Cyril Drummond Le Gros Clark	May 1941 – 25 December 1941	On 31 March 1941, Le Gros Clark announced the decision of the White Rajah, Charles Vyner Brooke, to introduce a democratic constitution. Japanese prisoner December 1941 – 6 July 1945 during the Japanese occupation of British Borneo, executed two months before the Surrender of Japan
		Vacant	25 December 1941 – 1946	
(17)		John Beville Archer	1946 – 1 July 1946	2nd time. Japanese prisoner December 1941 – 1945 during the Japanese occupation of British Borneo. The first and only officeholder following the Borneo campaign

== See also ==
- White Rajahs
- List of British representatives in the Raj of Sarawak
- History of Sarawak
