= List of British representatives in the Raj of Sarawak =

Flag of the Raj of Sarawak from 1870 to 1946.

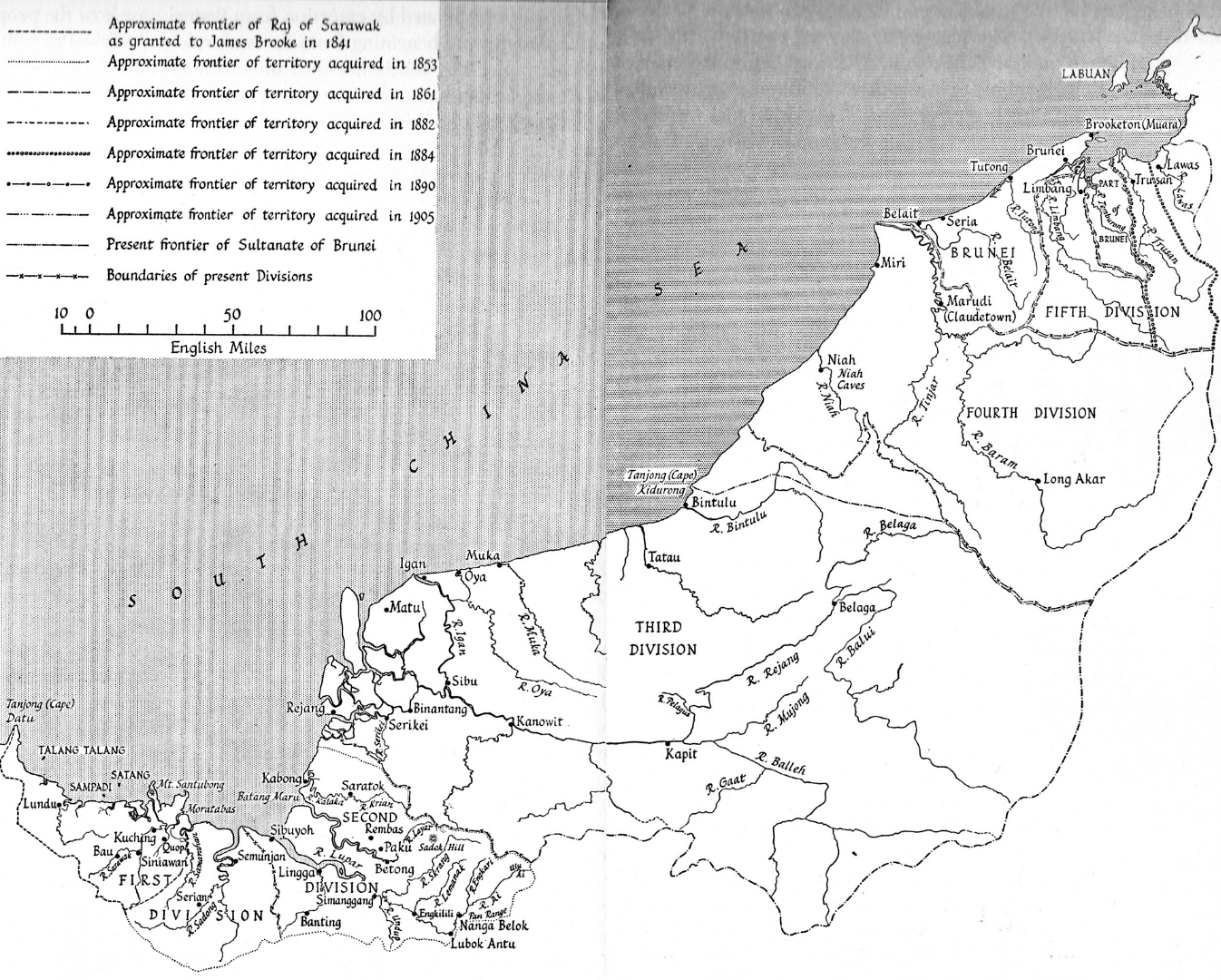
Map of the Raj of Sarawak, 1920s.

This article lists the British representatives in the Raj of Sarawak from 1888 to 1946. They were responsible for representing British interests in the Raj of Sarawak during the period of a British protectorate (from 14 June 1888 to 1 July 1946), until the country was ceded to the United Kingdom and became the Crown Colony of Sarawak.

== List ==
(Dates in italics indicate de facto continuation of office)

No.	Portrait	Name	Term	Notes
Agents for Sarawak and North Borneo
1		The governors of the Straits Settlements	14 June 1888 – 25 December 1941	Based in Singapore
Liaison Officer to Sarawak and North Borneo
2		Walter Evelyn Pepys	1940 – 25 December 1941	Japanese prisoner December 1941 – 1945 during the Japanese occupation of British Borneo
		Vacant	25 December 1941 – 1946	
Resident
3		John Coleraine Hanbury Barcroft	1946	
Representative
4		Christopher William Dawson	1946 – 1 July 1946	

== See also ==
- White Rajahs
- List of heads of government of the Raj of Sarawak
- History of Sarawak
