= Raj of Sarawak =

1841–1946 kingdom on northern Borneo

Raj of Sarawak: Kerajaan Sarawak (Malay); Menua Sarawak (Iban); 砂拉越王國 (Chinese)
- 1841–1946
- Flag Coat of arms
- Motto: Dum Spiro Spero ("While I Breathe, I Hope")
- Anthem: "Gone Forth Beyond the Sea"
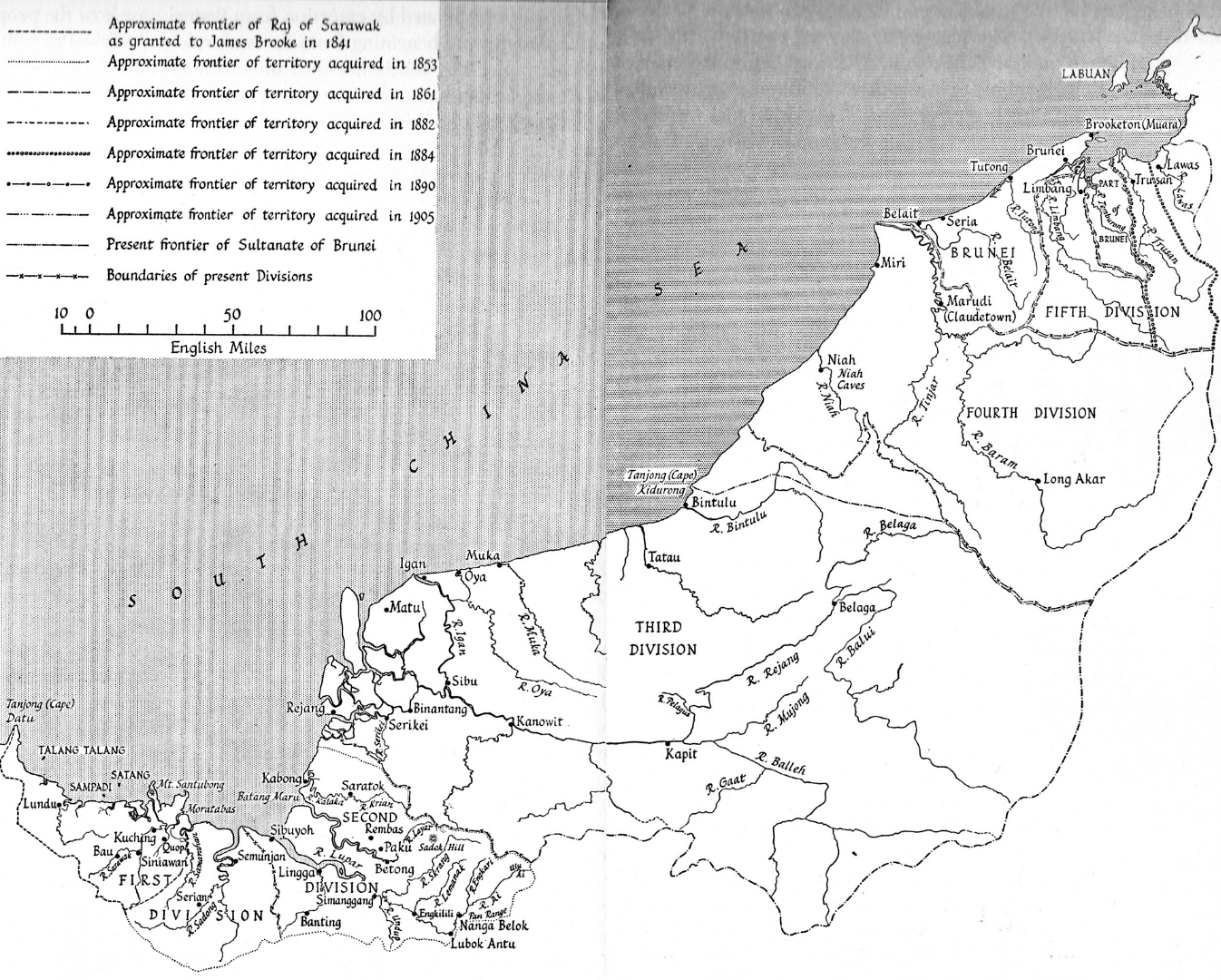
- The Raj in the 1920s
- Status: Independent sovereign state (1841–1888); Independent protected state (1888–1946)
- Capital: Kuching
- Common languages: English, Iban, Melanau, Bidayuh, Kenyah, Sarawak Malay, Chinese etc.
- Government: Absolute monarchy
- Rajah
  - 1841–1868: James Brooke
  - 1868–1917: Charles Brooke
  - 1917–1946: Charles Vyner Brooke
- Representatives
  - 1888–1893: Cecil Clementi Smith
  - 1946: Christopher William Dawson
- Legislature: Council Negri
- Historical era: New Imperialism
  - Rule granted: 24 September 1841
  - Anglo-Bruneian War: 1843–1847
  - Protected state: 14 June 1888
  - Japanese invasion: 16 December 1941
  - Allied liberation: 10 June 1945
  - Ceded as a Crown colony: 1 July 1946
- Currency: Sarawak dollar
Preceded by
Bruneian Empire
Sultanate of Sarawak
Succeeded by
Japanese occupation of British Borneo
British Military Administration (Borneo)
Crown Colony of Sarawak
- Today part of: Malaysia

The Raj of Sarawak, Kingdom of Sarawak, or State of Sarawak, was a kingdom founded in 1841 in northwestern Borneo and was in a treaty of protection with the United Kingdom from 1888. It was formed from a series of land concessions acquired by the Englishman James Brooke from the Sultan of Brunei. Sarawak was recognised as a sovereign state by the United States in 1850, and by the United Kingdom in 1864.

Following recognition, Brooke expanded the Raj's territory at the expense of Brunei. Several major rebellions occurred against his rule, causing him to be plagued by debt incurred in countering the rebellions, and the sluggish economic situation at the time. His nephew, Charles Brooke, succeeded James and normalised the situation by improving the economy, reducing government debt and establishing public infrastructure. In 1888, the Raj acquired protected state status from the British Government whilst avoiding cession.

To promote economic growth, Charles Brooke encouraged the migration of Chinese workers from Qing China and British Singapore for agricultural work. With proper economic planning and stability, Sarawak prospered and emerged as one of the world's major producers of black pepper, in addition to oil and the introduction of rubber plantations. He was succeeded by his son, Charles Vyner Brooke, but World War II and the arrival of Imperial Japanese forces ultimately brought an end to the Raj, with the territory placed under British Military Administration upon the Japanese capitulation in 1945, and annexed by Britain as its last acquisition as a Crown Colony in 1946, contrary to the Atlantic Charter.

== History ==
=== Foundation and early years ===
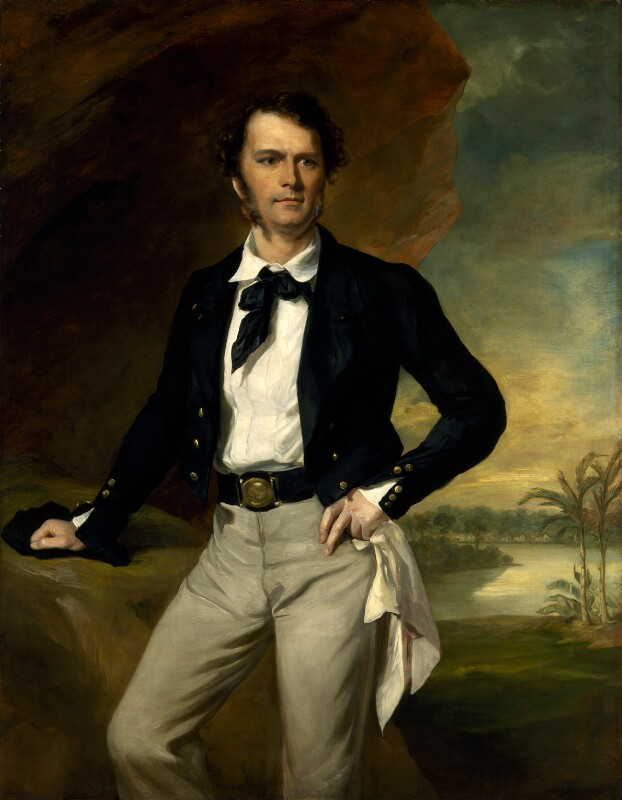
James Brooke, the founder of the Raj

The Raj was founded by James Brooke, an English former soldier and adventurer who arrived at the banks of the Sarawak River and berthed his schooner there in 1839. After having served in the First Anglo-Burmese War, where he was severely wounded in battle, Brooke returned to England in 1825 to recover from his injury. Despite his attempts to return to service, he was unable to return to his station in India before his temporary leave from the service expired. Overstaying his furlough resulted in his position in the military being forfeited, but he was awarded a pension by the government for his service. He continued on from India and went to China to improve his health.

On his way to China in 1830, he saw the islands of the Asiatic Archipelago, still generally unknown to Europeans. He returned to England and made an abortive trading journey to China in the brig Findlay before his father died in 1835. Inspired by the adventure stories regarding the success of the East India Company (EIC) where his father had been serving, and especially by the efforts of Stamford Raffles to expand the company influence in the Asiatic Archipelago, he purchased a schooner named Royalist using the £30,000 left to him by his father. He recruited a crew for the schooner, training in the Mediterranean Sea in late 1836, before beginning their sail to the Far East on 27 October 1838. By July 1839, he reached Singapore and came across some British sailors who had been shipwrecked and helped by Pengiran Raja Muda Hashim, the uncle of Sultan Omar Ali Saifuddin II of Brunei.

Brooke originally planned to sail to Marudu Bay in northwestern Borneo, but the British Governor-General in Singapore asked him to thank Raja Muda Hashim in southwestern Borneo. He sailed to the western coast of the island the following month, and on 14 August 1839 berthed his schooner on the banks of the Sarawak River and met Hashim to deliver the message. The Raja told Brooke that his presence in the area was to control a rebellion against the Sultanate of Brunei caused by the oppressive policies of Pengiran Indera Mahkota, a kinsman of the Sultan. Mahkota had earlier been dispatched by the Sultan to monopolise the antimony in the area; which as a result directly affected the income of the local Malays there amid growing frustration from the indigenous Land Dayak, who had been forced to work in the mines for about 10 years. It has also been alleged that the rebellion against Brunei was aided by the neighbouring Sultanate of Sambas and the government of the Dutch East Indies, who wanted to establish economic rights over the antimony. Due to these disturbances Brooke had limited access to explore the country, but he managed to explore up the Samarrahan River and spent some time at Rumah Jugah's longhouse at Lundu. On 2 October 1839 he returned to Singapore. Brooke then spent another six months cruising along the coasts of the Celebes Islands before returning to Sarawak on 29 August 1840.

=== Establishment ===
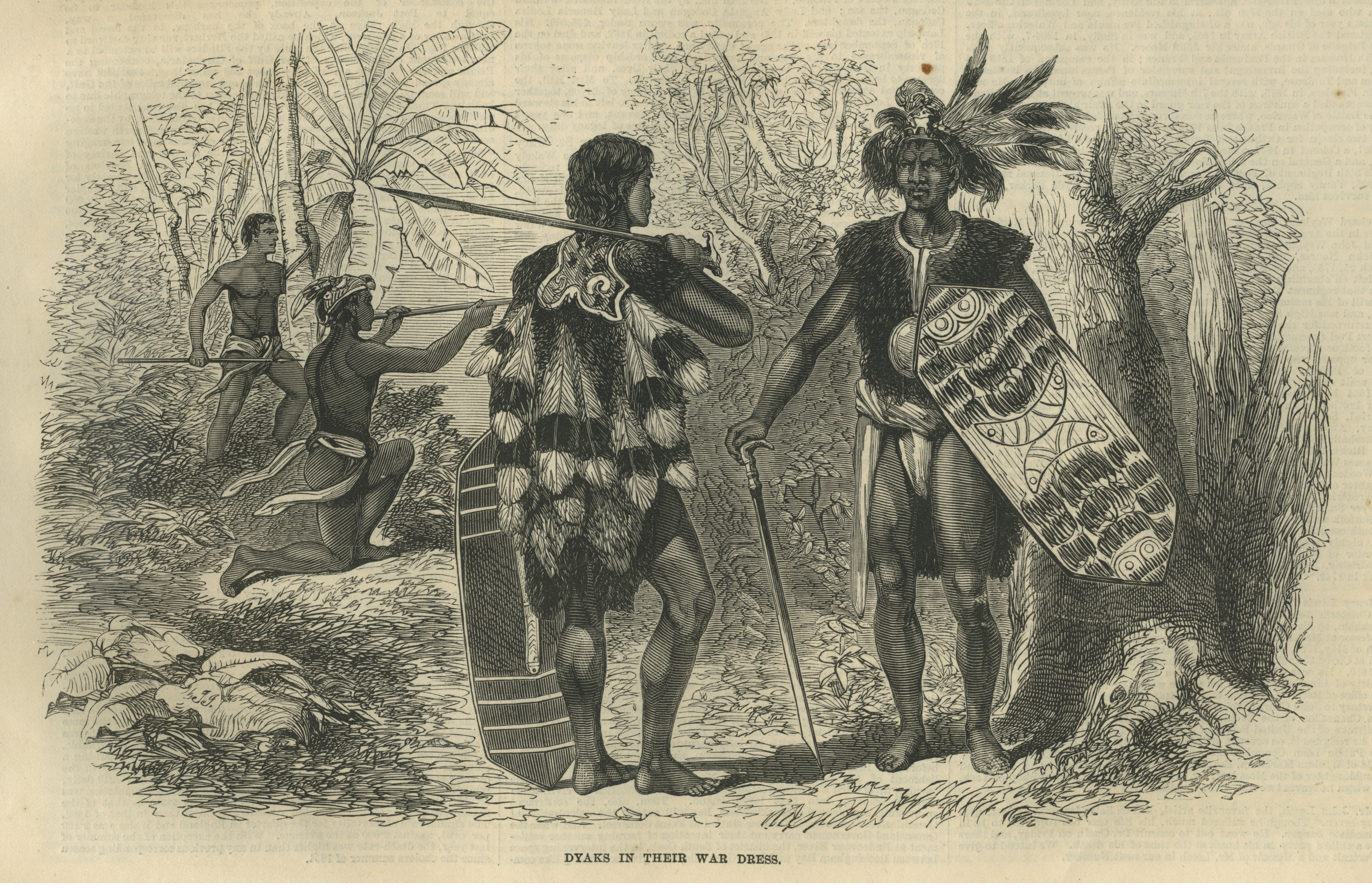
The Dayaks, who subsequently became Brooke followers and most loyal to the raj along with the local Malays of Sarawak

When he returned to Sarawak, the rebellion against Brunei's rule was still ongoing and Hashim asked Brooke to help. Brooke joined Mahkota's forces at Leda Tanah on 18 October 1840. By 20 December 1840 the rebels offered to surrender to Brooke provided they should not be put to death. Hashim initially refused to pardon them and wanted to execute them all, but was convinced by Brooke to forgive them, as Brooke had taken the major part in their suppression. "Hassim agreed to spare the insurgents’ lives and took the wives and children of the insurgency's leaders as hostages. Of the leaders themselves, Datu Patinggi Abdul Gapur and Datu Tumanggong Mersal withdrew to the protection of Sambas, while Datu Patinggi Ali found refuge among the Malays at Sarikei."

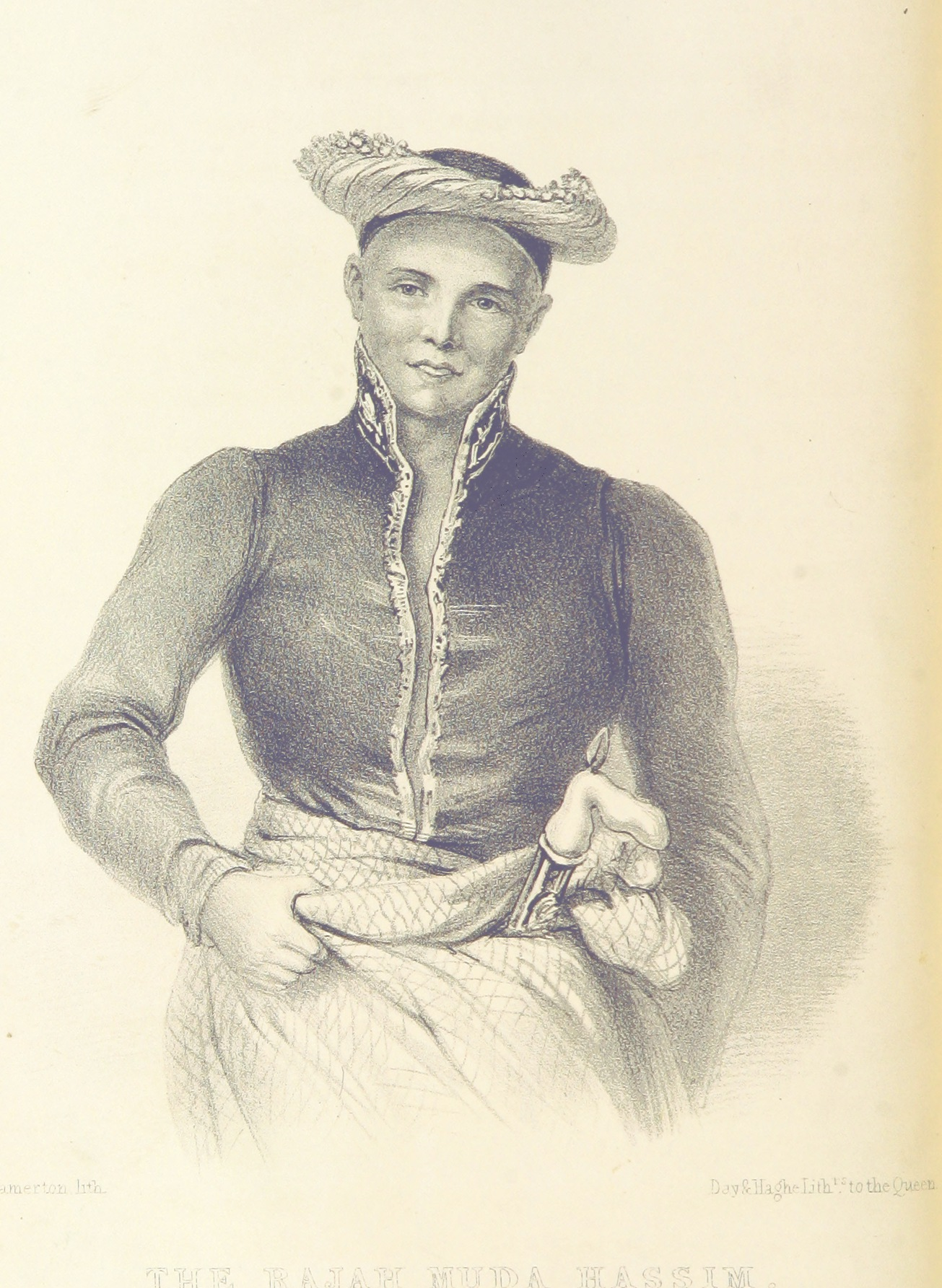
This sketch labelled Raja Muda Hashim in Captain Keppel's book is in fact Pengiran Indera Mahkota according to James Brooke.

In exchange for Brooke's support, Muda Hashim had promised Brooke the country of Siniawan and Sarawak, and its government and trade. On 14 February 1841, Brooke received papers declaring him "resident at Sarawak," which granted him the permission to live in the province, and "to seek profit by trade". Brooke left the next day in the Royalist for Singapore, only to return to Sarawak in May 1841 with a second boat: the Swift, filled with British manufactured goods to trade with Muda Hashim. Brooke was disappointed upon his return that the house Hashim had promised to build for him was not ready, and the antimony he wanted in trade for the manufactured goods had not yet been worked. Furthermore, Hashim began questioning giving the territory to Brooke, which was fanned by Mahkota, who had been deprived of his power in the area in favour of Brooke. This led Hashim to constantly delay the recognition of concession which frustrated Brooke. "Brooke’s estrangement from Hassim provided the Sarawak Malay datus with opportunities to re-establish their positions. They sent a delegation to Brooke led by Datu Tumanggong Mersal and Datu Patinggi Ali’s son, "to request him to become their Rajah, offering to support him by force of arms." On 23 September 1841, Brooke, with the Royalist fully armed, went ashore to Hashim's audience chamber and called on him to negotiate. With little choice, and putting the blame mainly on Mahkota, Hashim granted Sarawak to Brooke on 24 September 1841. Brooke issued new laws for the territory banning slavery, headhunting and piracy; and by July 1842, his appointment was confirmed by Sultan Omar Ali Saifuddin II.

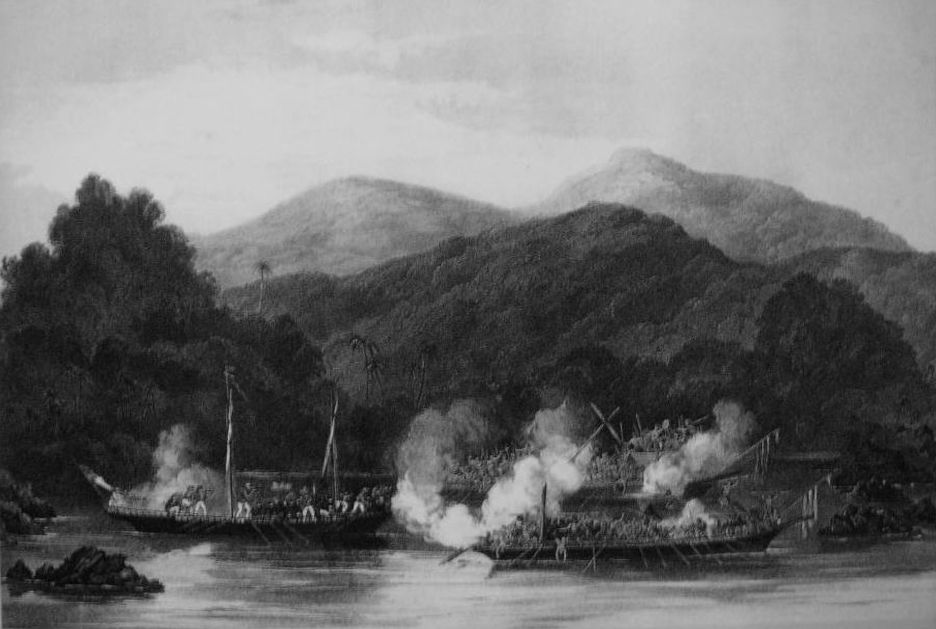
Iranun pirates attacking the 'Jolly Bachelor' a boat owned by Brooke in 1843

From 1843, Brooke actively suppressed piracy on the coasts of western and northern Borneo together with Captain Henry Keppel in HMS Dido. After talks with Serib Sahib, who controlled the Sadong River, Keppel and Brooke's native forces attacked three rivers in the Saribas; the Padi, Paku and Rimbas. After which, Keppel was called away on orders, but returned in August 1844 along with EIC steamer Phlegethon. By this time Serib Sahib had abandoned the Sadong and retreated to Patusan. Keppel and Brooke's native forces once again overwhelmed all opposition in Patusan and the Undop, but were ambushed by the Sea Dayak on the river Skrang at Karangan Peris, resulting in the death of Datu Patinggi Ali. Shortly after this punitive expedition Brooke heard that Mahkota, the former administrator of the Kuching area, had taken shelter at the Lingga, and managed to capture him and send him back to Brunei.

=== Relationship to Brunei ===
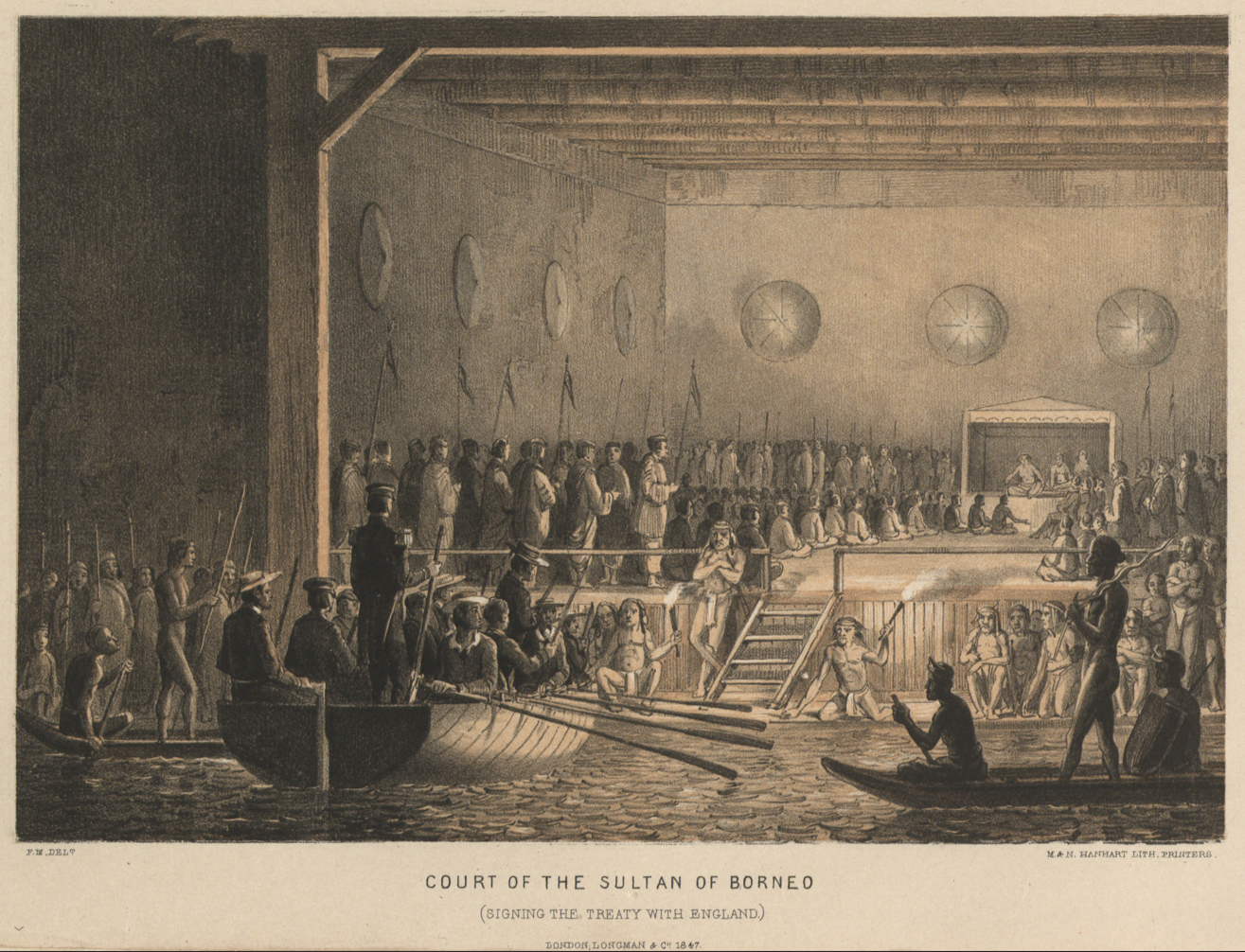
The signing of Anglo-Bruneian Treaty on 23 October 1844 at the Brunei palace.

To prevent any further dispute with Brunei, Brooke hoped to reform the sultanate's administration and establish a pro-British government through Hashim and his brother Pengiran Badruddin. In October 1844, Brooke and Captain Sir Edward Belcher returned the two brothers to Brunei in HMS Samarang and the EIC steamer Phlegethon. The vessels anchored at the Sultan's audience chamber, demanding Pengiran Yusof's position as Bendahara be replaced by Hashim and asking the Sultan to pledge to suppress piracy in his dominions and to transfer ownership of the island of Labuan to the British (although the British government had not asked for this). The status of Brooke as a Rajah and consul for the British at the time was also controversial as he was not recognised by the British government to represent British subjects. Indirectly, Brooke had become involved in an internal dynastic dispute of Brunei.

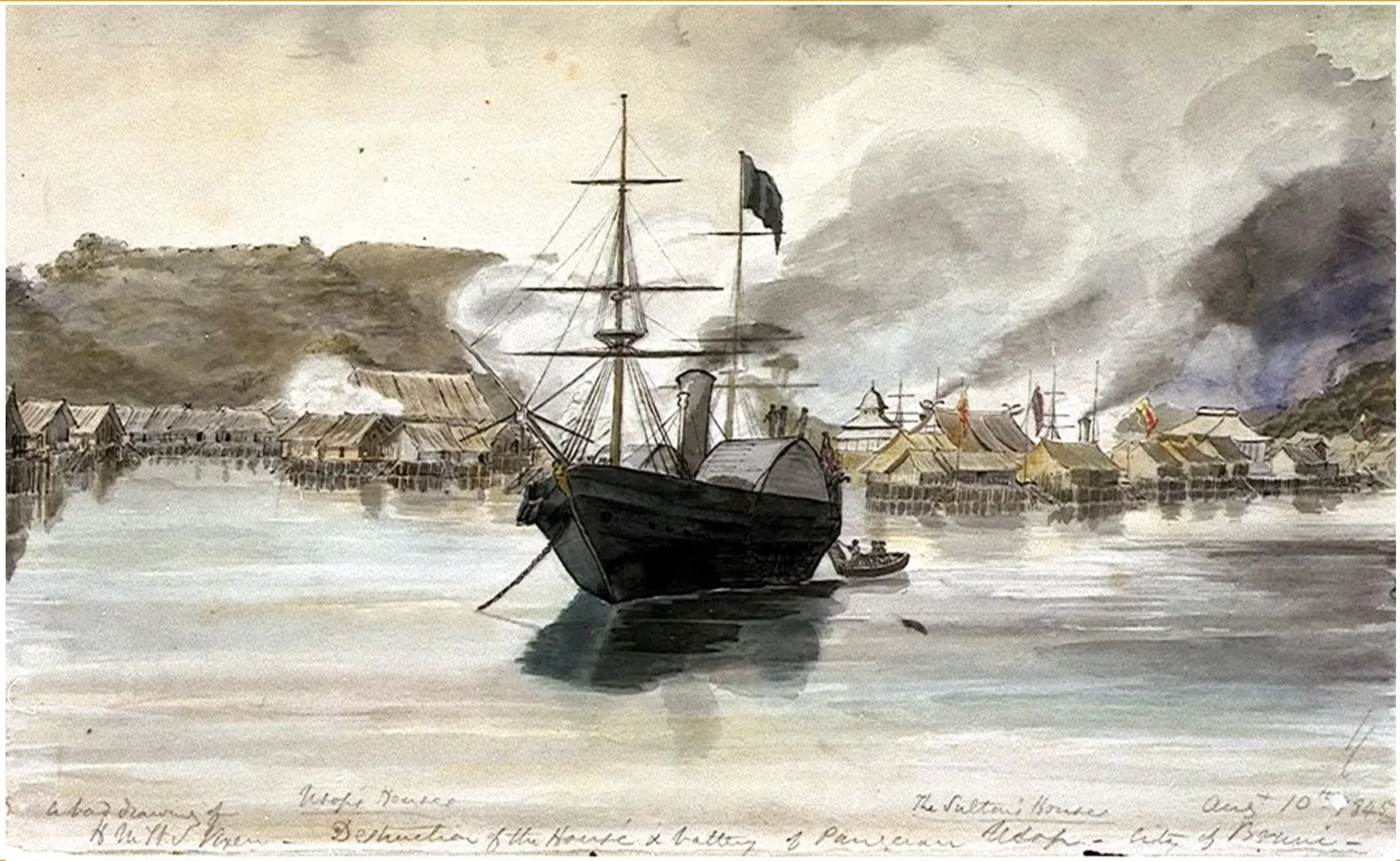
HMS Vixen firing on Pengiran Yusof's house and battery

In August 1845, Rear-Admiral Thomas Cochrane arrived at Brunei with a squadron of six to eight ships to release two Lascar seamen who were believed to be hidden there. Badruddin accused Yusof of being involved in the slave trade due to his close relations with a notable pirate leader, Sharif Usman, in Marudu Bay and the Sultanate of Sulu. Denying the allegation, Yusof refused to meet with Cochrane and escaped after Cochrane threatened him with force before regaining his own force in Brunei's capital. Cochrane sailed to Marudu Bay in pursuit of Usman while Badruddin defeated Yusof. Hashim established a rightful position in Brunei Town to become the next sultan after defeating the pirates led by Yusof, who fled to Kimanis in northern Borneo, where he was executed. Yusof was the Sultan's favourite noble, and Hashim's victory reduced the Sultan's son's chances of becoming the next leader. After his capture in Sarawak in 1844, Mahkota became the Sultan's adviser in Yusof's absence. He prevailed on the Sultan to order the execution of Hashim, whose presence had become unwelcome to the royal family, especially due to his close ties with Brooke that were favourable to English policy. An adventurer named Haji Saman, who was connected to Yusof, also played upon the Sultan's fear that Hashim would take his throne.

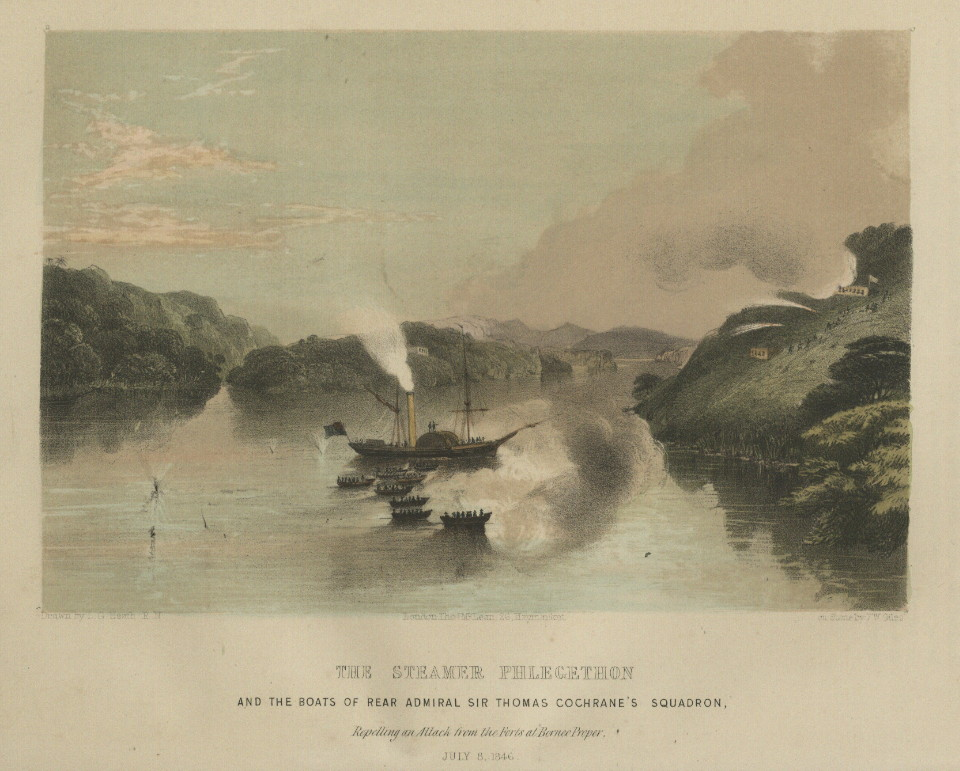
Steamer Phlegethon and the boats of Thomas Cochrane repelling an attack from the forts of Borneo Proper on 8 July 1846

By the Sultan's order, Hashim, Badruddin, and their family were assassinated in 1846. One of Badruddin's slaves, Japar, survived the attack and intercepted HMS Hazard, which brought him to Sarawak to inform Brooke. Enraged by the news, Brooke organised an expedition to avenge Hashim's death with the aid of Cochrane from the Royal Navy with Phlegethon. On 6 July 1846, Sultan Omar Ali Saifuddin II complained in a letter about the discourtesy of HMS Hazard and invited Cochrane to ascend the capital of Brunei with two boats.

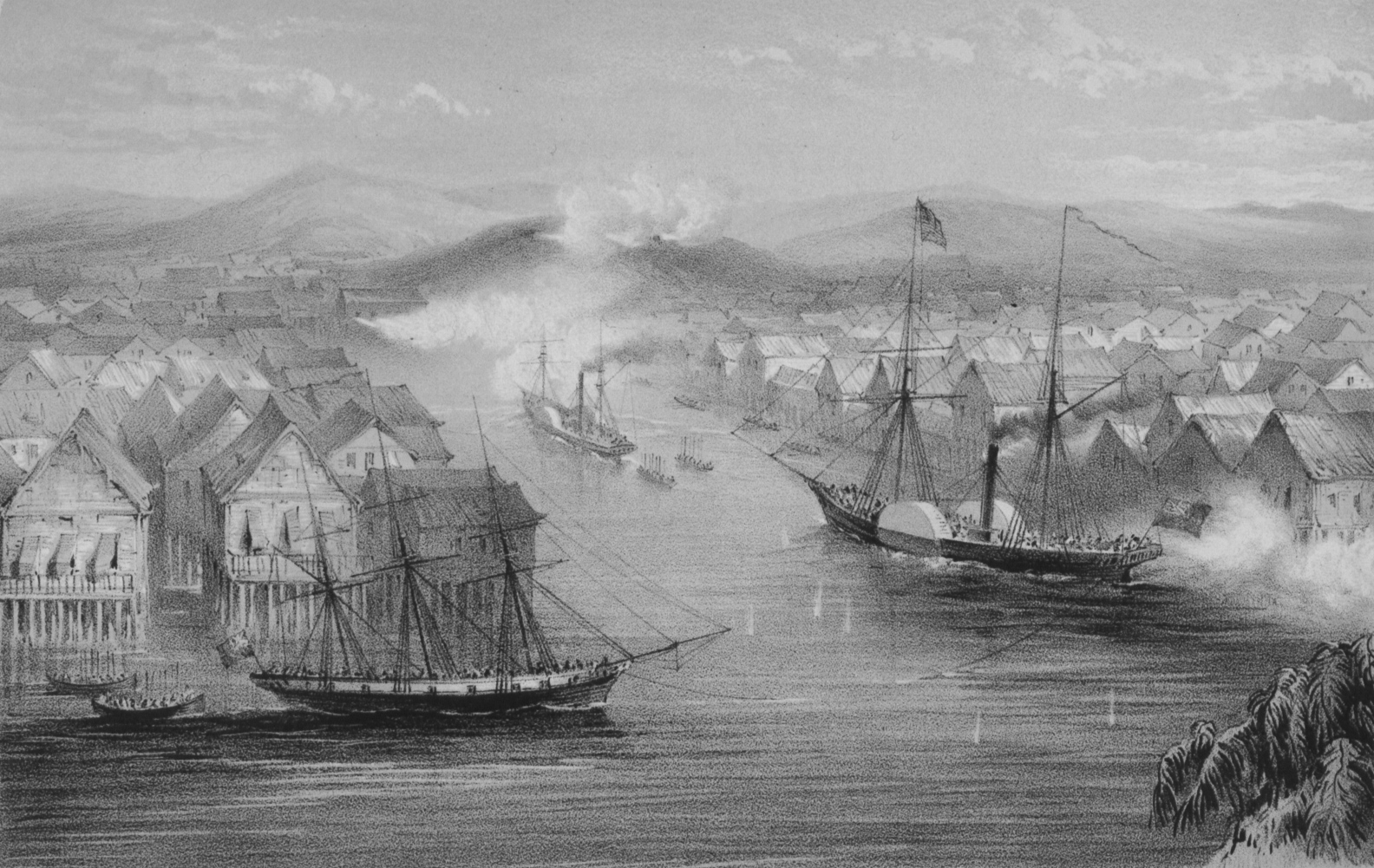
HEICS Phlegethon, HMS Spiteful and HMS Royalist attack and capture Brunei 8 July 1846

On 8 July, HEICS Phlegethon, HMS Spiteful and HMS Royalist moved upriver, where they were fired on from every position with slight damage. Mahkota and the Sultan retreated upriver while most of the population fled upon their arrival at Brunei's capital, leaving the brother of the Sultan's son, Pengiran Muhammad, who was badly wounded, and Pengiran Mumin, an opponent of the Sultan's son who despised his royal family's decision to be involved in conflict with the British. The British destroyed the town forts and invited the population to return with no harm to be done to them while the Sultan hid in the jungle. Another expedition was sent to the interior but failed to find the Sultan. Brooke remained in Brunei with Captain Rodney Mundy and HMS Iris along with the Phlegethon and HMS Hazard while the main expedition continued their mission to suppress piracy in northern Borneo.

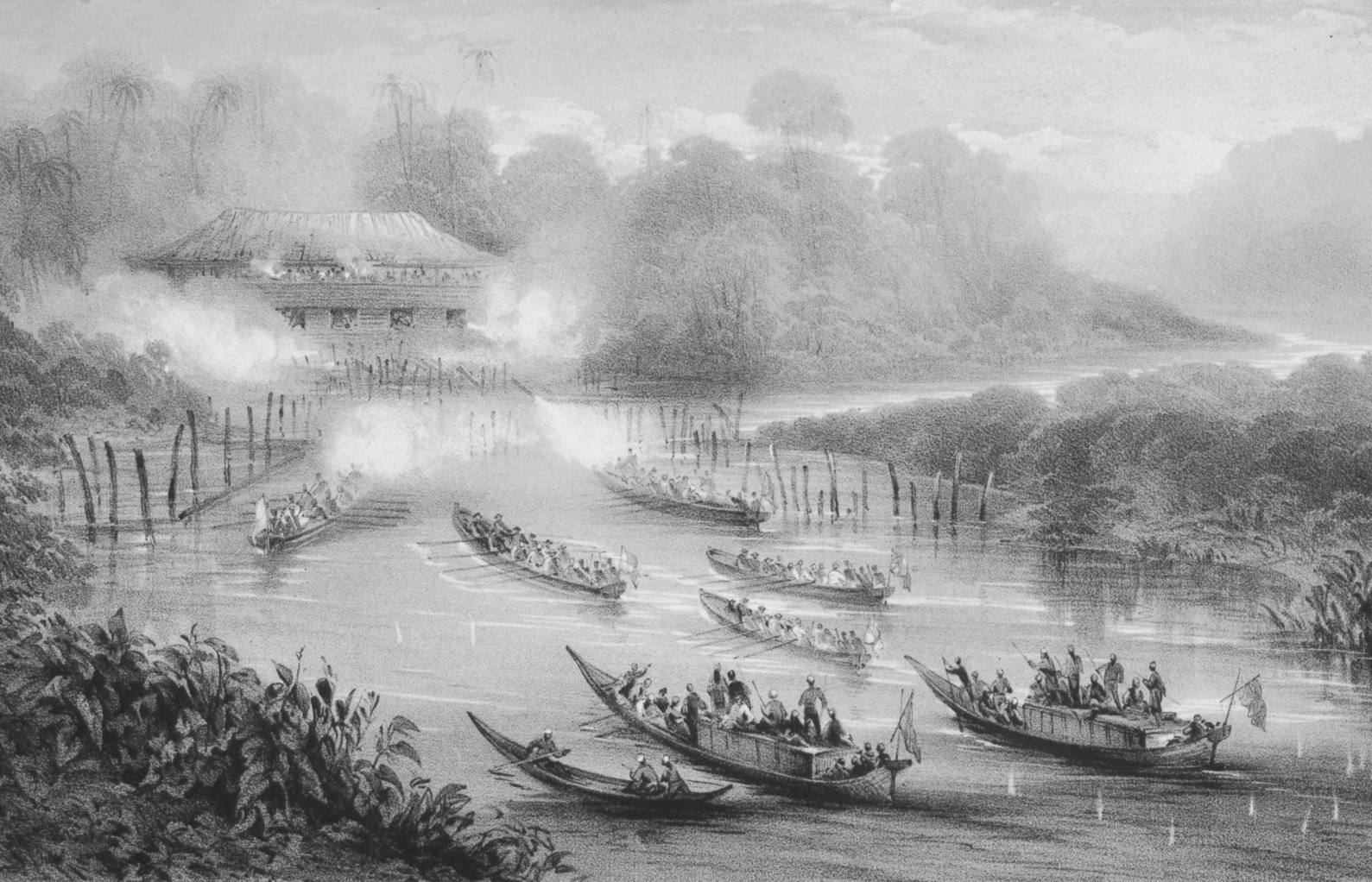
Boats of HMS Iris and HEICS Phlegethon and natives from Kimanis, Papar and Kallas attack Haji Saman's house and battery - 16 August 1846

Upon finding that Haji Saman was living in Membakut and involved in the plotting that caused Hashim's death, HEICS Phlegethon and HMS Iris sailed there, destroyed Haji Saman's house, and captured Membakut, though Saman escaped. Brooke returned again to Brunei and finally persuaded the Sultan to return to the capital, where he wrote a letter of apology to Queen Victoria for the killings of Hashim, his brother and their family. Through his confession, the Sultan recognised Brooke's authority over Sarawak and mining rights throughout the territory without requiring him to pay any tribute, and granted the island of Labuan to the British. Brooke departed Brunei and left Mumin and Mundy in charge to keep the Sultan in line until the British government made a final decision to acquire the island. Following the ratification agreement of the transfer of Labuan to the British, the Sultan agreed to allow British forces to suppress all piracy along the coast of Borneo.

=== Later years ===
The Sarawak flag first hoisted 21 September 1848 as described by James Brooke in his letter to Lord Palmerston dated 14 March 1849 "a yellow field, with a cross per pale red and black"

In 1847, acting as HM Commissioner and British Consul to the Sultan and Independent Chiefs of Borneo, Brooke negotiated the Treaty of Friendship and Commerce. One of its articles prevented the sultanate from engaging in any concession treaty with other foreign powers, especially after the visit of USS Constitution in 1845. But the United States at the time had no intention to establish any solid presence in Asia and the Pacific. By 1850, the US recognised Brooke's raj as an independent state. Sultan Omar Ali Saifuddin II died in 1852 and was succeeded by Mumin, a success in Brooke's efforts to establish a pro-British government in Brunei. In 1852, the new Sultan ceded the Saribas and Skrang districts, which later became the Second Division, to Brooke due to conflict with pirates.

Three major rebellions led by Rentap (1853), Liu Shan Bang (1857) and Syarif Masahor (1860) shook the Rajah's administration. Together with the stagnant economic conditions, the rebellions put Brooke into severe debt. He was driven to plan to cede Sarawak to the British to settle his debt; some of Britain's members of parliament and businessmen supported the idea, but Prime Minister Lord Derby rejected it, fearing that introducing a British taxation system would shock the population more than exercising their own system under the Rajahs. There was also concern about its financial viability and probable drain on the Exchequer. Brooke then thought to sell his kingdom to Belgium, France, Russia, Brunei again, or to other European powers rather than to the neighbouring Dutch, who were ready to retake Sarawak. Brooke's intention had already been decried by neighbouring British governors such as Labuan Governor Hennessy, who, while respecting the Rajah, considered Sarawak a mere vassal state of Brunei.

Territorial gains from 1841 to 1905

Before the ongoing piracy suppression, a major battle with the Illanuns of the Moro pirates from the southern Philippines occurred in November 1862. In 1864, the United Kingdom appointed a Consul to Sarawak and recognised the Raj. British warships saluted the Raj's flag with 21 guns while entering Kuching as a sign of recognition. The Netherlands refused recognition. Brooke then expanded his Raj into territory of Brunei. In 1861, he acquired the Rajang River basin, which subsequently became the Third Division. The expansion continued after his death in 1868, when he was succeeded by his nephew, Charles Brooke.

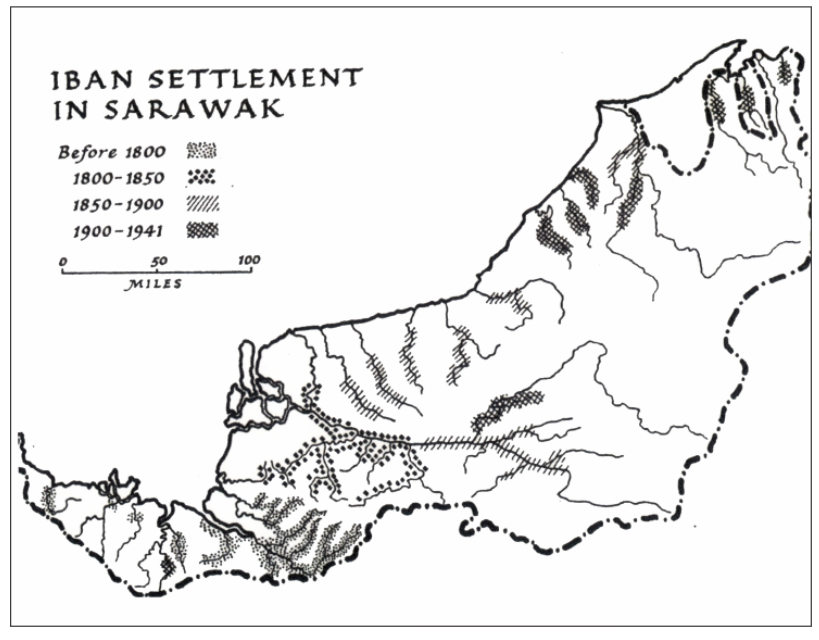
The Iban migrations towards northern Sarawak and Brunei was also assisted by Brooke's administration, turning Iban from a regional tribe from Kapuas Hulu in the 1750s to become one of the major ethnic groups in modern-day Sarawak

Under Charles' administration, Sarawak's economy grew rapidly, especially with the discovery of oil, introduction of rubber, and construction of public infrastructure as his main priorities to stabilise the economy and reduce government debt. He encouraged the migration of Chinese, especially in agricultural sectors, where most of them settled around Kuching (mainly Hokkien and Teochew), Sibu (mainly Fuzhou) and Sri Aman (mainly Teochew). Charles was trusted and respected for his fairness and strict order, though he was not as popular among the local Malays as his uncle, while being a close friend to the Dayak. Sarawak prospered under his rule and he sought no protection from any European power other than Britain. Requests for protection from the British were rejected in 1869 and 1879, but Charles persisted, and secured Protected State status from them on 14 June 1888. He ruled Sarawak until his death in 1917 and was succeeded by his son, Charles Vyner Brooke.

=== World War II and decline ===
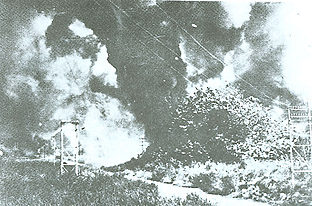
Lutong oil refinery and storage facilities destroyed by the British in anticipation of Japanese invasion

After World War I, the Empire of Japan began to expand its range in Asia and the Pacific. Vyner was aware of the growing threat and began to institute reforms. Under the treaty of protection, Britain was responsible for Sarawak's defence but could do little, most of its forces having been deployed to the war in Europe against Germany and the Kingdom of Italy. The defence of Sarawak depended on a single Indian infantry battalion, the 2/15 Punjab Regiment, together with the local forces of Sarawak and Brunei. As Sarawak had several oil refineries in Miri and Lutong, the British feared that they would fall to the Japanese and thus instructed the infantry to carry out a scorched earth policy.

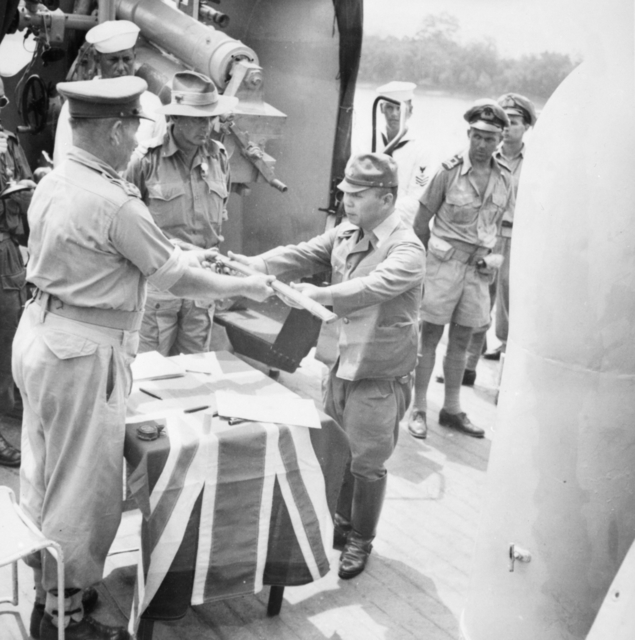
The official surrender ceremony of the Japanese to the Australian Imperial Force (AIF) on board HMAS Kapunda in Kuching on 11 September 1945

On 16 December 1941, a Japanese navy detachment on Sagiri arrived at Miri from Cam Ranh Bay in French Indochina. The Japanese then launched an air attack on Kuching on 19 December, bombing parts of the town's airfield while machine-gunning people in the streets. The attack created panic and sent residents fleeing to rural areas. The Dutch submarine HNLMS K XVI sunk Sagiri, but with the arrival of the Shirakumo and other ships the Japanese secured the town on 24 December. On 7 January 1942, Japanese troops in Sarawak crossed the border of Dutch Borneo and proceeded to neighbouring North Borneo. The 2/15 Punjab Regiment withdrew to Dutch Borneo and surrendered on 9 March after most of the Allies had surrendered in Java. A steamship of Sarawak, the SS Vyner Brooke, was sunk while evacuating nurses and wounded servicemen in the aftermath of the fall of Singapore. Most of its surviving crew were massacred on Bangka Island.

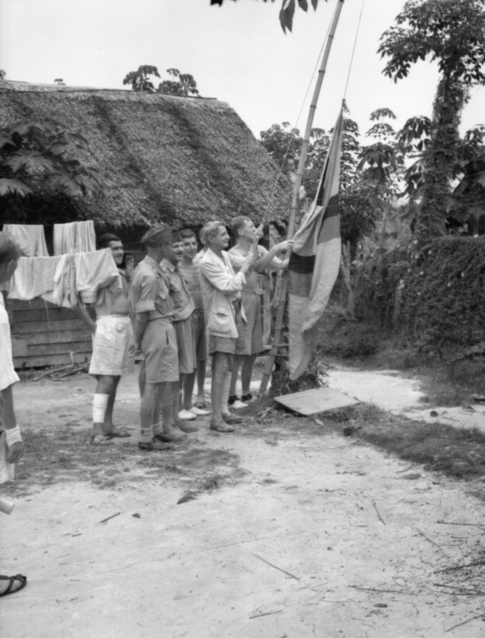
The hoisting of Sarawak's flag by the ex-internees of Allied prisoner of war (POW) compound in Kuching, 12 September 1945

Lacking air protection, Sarawak and the rest of the island fell to the Japanese and Vyner took sanctuary in Australia. Many of the British and Australian soldiers captured after the fall of Malaya and Singapore were brought to Borneo and held as prisoners of war in Batu Lintang camp in Sarawak and Sandakan camp in North Borneo. The Japanese military authorities placed the southern part of Borneo under the navy while its army managed the north. As part of the Allied Campaign to retake their possessions in the East, Allied forces were sent to Borneo in the Borneo Campaign and liberated the island. The Australian Imperial Force (AIF) played a significant role in the mission. The Allies' Z Special Unit provided intelligence that facilitated the AIF landings. Most of Sarawak's major towns were bombed during this period. The war ended on 15 August 1945 when the Japanese surrendered, and the British Military Administration began administering Sarawak in September. Vyner returned to administer Sarawak but ceded it to the British government as a Crown colony on 1 July 1946 due to a lack of resources to finance reconstruction.

== Government ==
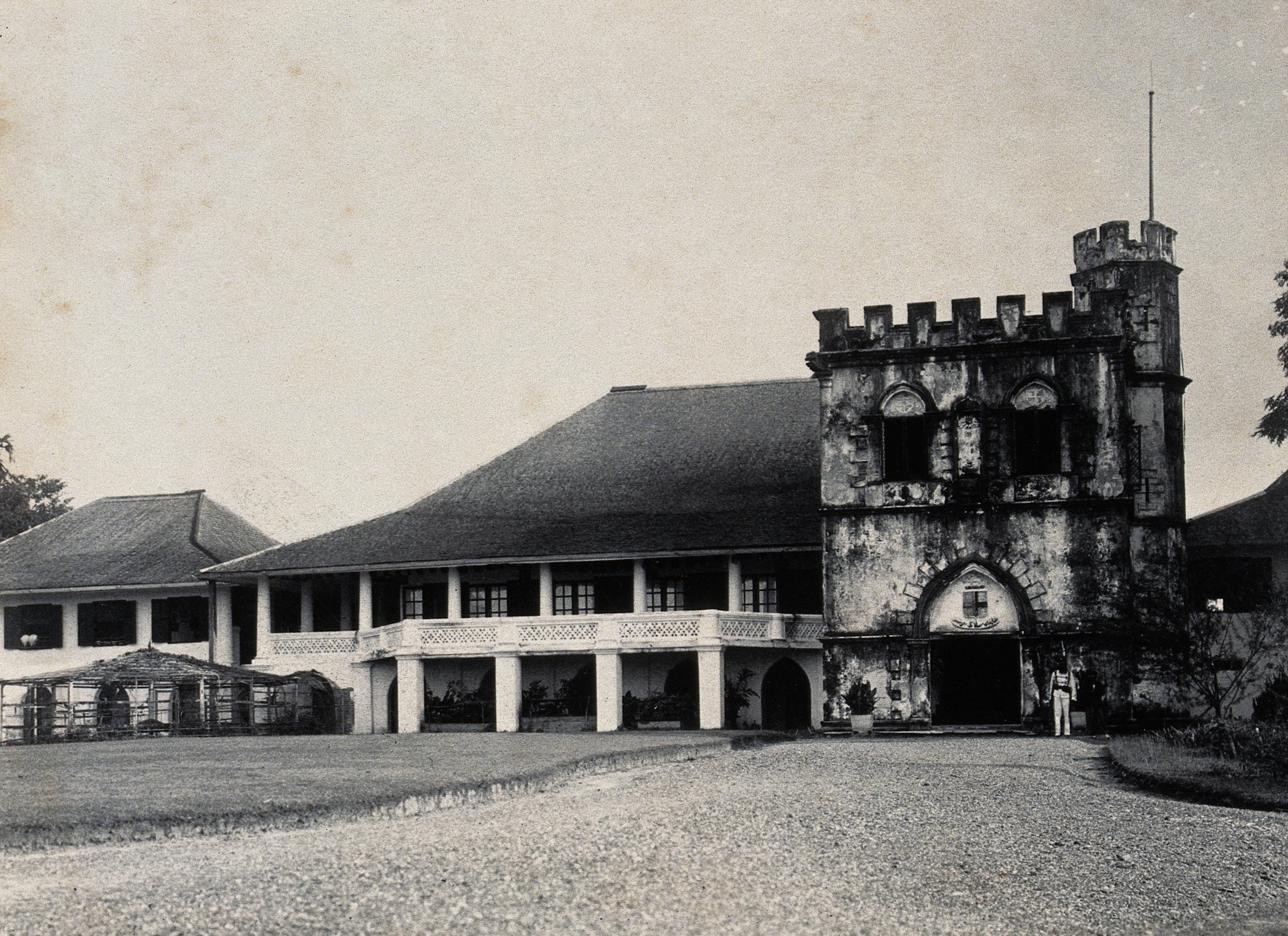
The Astana, the palace of the White Rajahs since Charles Brooke reign; c. 1896

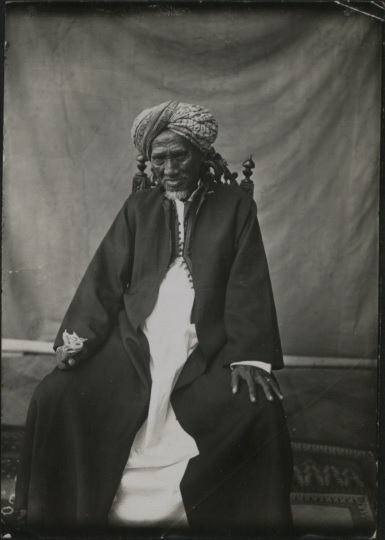
Datu Bandar Buassan for over 40 years was one of the Rajah's ministers and also a member of Supreme Council, c. 1905

Prior to the establishment of the Sarawak Administrative Service under Charles Brooke, there had been no formal civil administration. The civil service recruited Europeans, mainly British officers, to run district outstations where the residents became exposed to and trained in many British and European methods and culture, while retaining the customs of the indigenous people. After the acquisition of more territory, Sarawak was divided into five divisions, each headed by a Resident. A Resident's job was to establish law and order, convene courts to settle disputes, punish crimes, be accessible at all times to the natives, and "gain the confidence of the chiefs of the wilder tribes and to lead them to accept the Sarawak flag and the benefits of the Rajah's government". The Rajahs also encouraged the establishment of schools, healthcare services and transport.

At least 24 forts were built throughout Sarawak during the Brooke era, which were primarily used as administrative centres and centres for defence.

The government worked to restore peace where piracy and tribal feuds had grown rampant and its success depended ultimately on the co-operation of the native village headmen, while the Native Officers acted as a bridge. The Sarawak Rangers was established in 1862 as a para-military force of the raj. It was superseded by the Sarawak Constabulary in 1932 as a police force, with 900 members mainly comprising Dayaks and Malays.

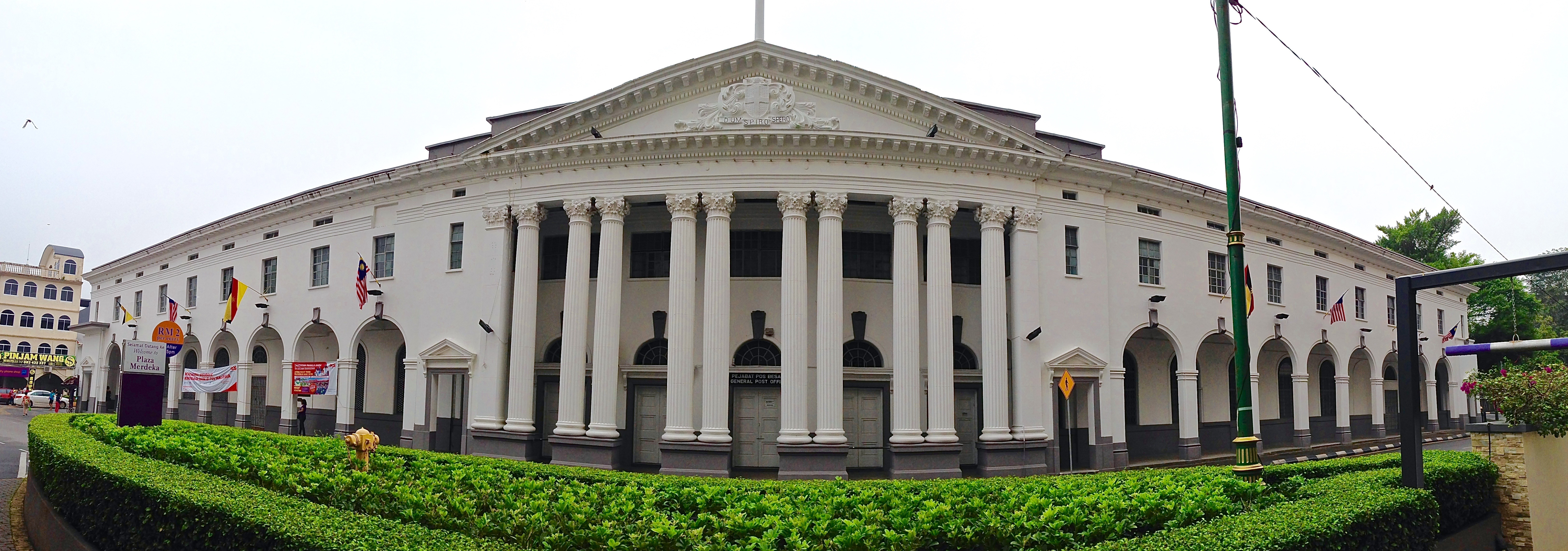
The Kuching General Post Office building, built in 1931 with neoclassical architecture; pictured in 2015

As a British protected state, all foreign relations were conducted under the purview of the British government although internally remaining an independent state ruled by the Rajahs. According to an agreement signed on 14 June 1888, it was stipulated:

I. The State of Sarawak shall continue to be governed and administered by the said Rajah and his successors as an independent State under the protection of Great Britain; but such protection shall confer no right on Her Majesty's Government to interfere with the internal administration of the State further than is herein provided.
II. In case any question should hereafter arise respecting the rights of succession to the present or any future Ruler of Sarawak, such question shall be referred to Her Majesty's Government for decision.
III. The relations between the State of Sarawak and all foreign States, including the States of Brunei and North Borneo, shall be conducted by Her Majesty's Government, or in accordance with its directions; and if any difference should arise between the Government of Sarawak and that of any other State, the Government of Sarawak agrees to abide by the decision of Her Majesty's Government, and to take all steps necessary to give effect thereto.
IV. Her Majesty's Government shall have the right to establish British Consular officers in any part of the State of Sarawak, who shall receive exequaturs in the name of the Government of Sarawak. They shall enjoy whatever privileges are usually granted to the Consular officers, and shall be entitled to hoist the British flag over their residences and public offices.
V. British subjects, commerce, and shipping shall enjoy the same right, privileges, and advantages as the subjects, commerce, and shipping of the most favoured nation, as well as any other rights, privileges, and advantages which may be enjoyed by the subjects, commerce and shipping of the State of Sarawak.
VI. No cession or other alienation of any part of the territory of the State of Sarawak shall be made by the Rajah or his successors to any foreign State, or the subjects or the citizens thereof, without the consent of Her Majesty's Government; but this restriction shall not apply to ordinary grants or leases of lands or houses to private individuals for purposes of residence, agriculture, commerce, or other business.

== Economy ==
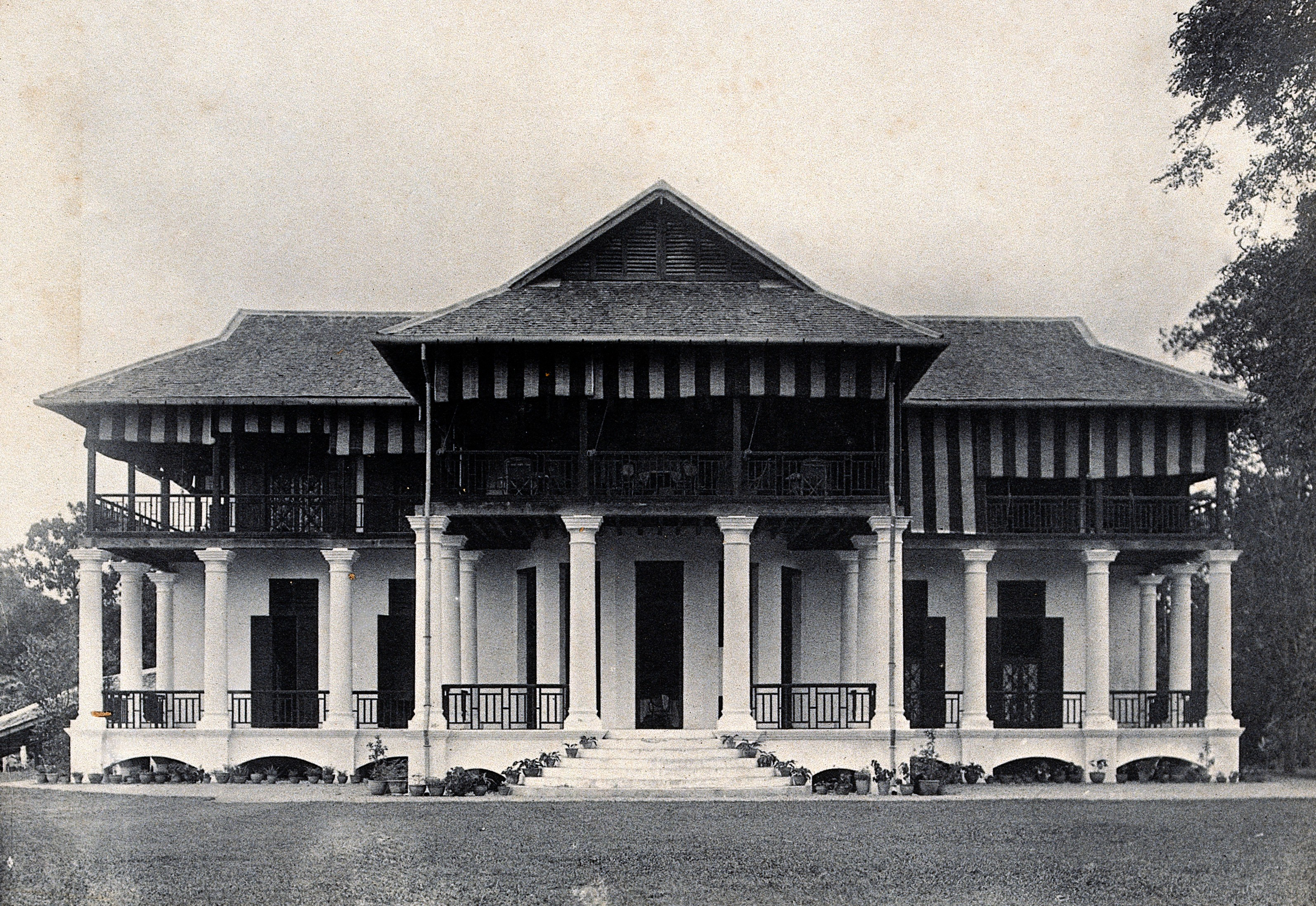
The Borneo Company Limited building in Kuching, c. 1896

=== Population ===
Upon acquisition of his first territories in the First Division, James Brooke came into possession of a large quantity of antimony from mines around the area. At the time of his arrival, a land tenure system known as the Native Customary Rights had been practised by the indigenous communities. James Brooke's first priority was to abolish headhunting among the indigenous communities of the interior. The kingdom's authorities conducted repeated raids on Sea Dayak villages and, facing a major rebellion, ultimately forced them to practice horticulture and abandon headhunting. Land Dayaks had also been involved in headhunting but more readily abandoned the practice and became loyal followers of James Brooke. Most Malay coastal villages were also raided as part of the kingdom's policy to combat piracy and slavery. Despite success in these endeavours, stagnant economic conditions persisted and the kingdom amassed huge debts.

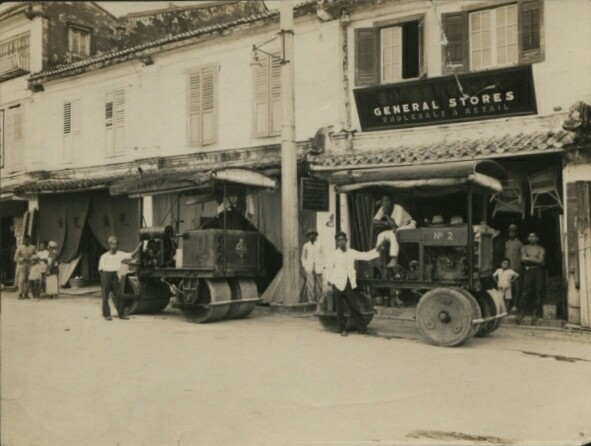
The Main Bazaar in Chinatown, Kuching, c. 1900s

James Brooke promoted Chinese immigration, convinced that they would inject vigour into the economy and prove an encouragement to indigenous communities to participate. Initially, most of the immigrants were miners originating from Sambas in neighbouring Dutch Borneo. These later formed a Kongsi system in Bau. The Charles Brooke continued this policy, particularly targeting the agricultural sector. Conflicts ensued between the government and the Chinese in 1857, believed to have arisen in relation to the Second Opium War, among other things.

There was no forced labour, except for prisoners doing public works and roads repair. In contrast to Dutch East Indies's forced cultivation system (cultuurstelsel), the indigenous people of Sarawak paid only a small amount of door tax and land rent.

=== Companies ===
Borneo Company Limited was formed in 1856. It was involved in a wide range of businesses in Sarawak, including trade, banking, agriculture, mineral exploration and development. The second Rajah worked to stabilise the economy and reduce government debt. The economy grew significantly under his reign, with total exports reaching $386,439 (Sarawak dollars) and imports $414,756 in 1863.

=== Land ===
The Rajah established the land tenure policy in 1863 with some minor modifications throughout James Brooke's rule. Every inhabitant in Sarawak was entitled to three acres of land, in which sale was prohibited, and no one could own more than 100 acres without the permission of the government. Although the majority of the lands were in smallholders, the Brooke government granted several land concessions to Borneo Company Limited to develop rubber, timber, oil, coal, and antimony.

=== Agriculture ===
In 1869, by which time total trade had reached $3,262,500, the Charles Brooke invited Chinese black pepper and gambier growers from Singapore to cultivate their crops in Sarawak. As a result, by the early 20th century, Sarawak became one of the world's major producers of pepper. The kingdom was a relative latecomer to the natural rubber boom due to the reluctance of Charles Brooke to give over indigenous farmland to European companies. In 1910, Charles Brooke declined offers by five foreign companies to set up large-scale rubber plantations here because speculation of rubber prices was "a mania at the present which did not suit the quiet non-speculative spirit of the country". Only five large rubber estates were established during his reign. Oil reserves were discovered in his final years. From the 1930s, through the work of the Chinese businesses in the kingdom, it became a significant raw material supplier, with Singapore as a major trading partner.

=== Currency ===
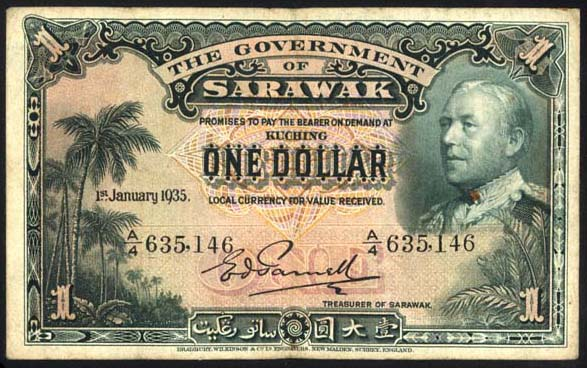
One Sarawak dollar, 1935

The Sarawak dollar was first issued in 1858 and remained at par with the Straits dollar. Different notes were issued by the Sarawak Government Treasury, the earliest notes using English, Jawi and Chinese characters. From the 1880s, the notes' background featured the Rajah's portrait and coat of arms.

== Society ==
=== Demography ===
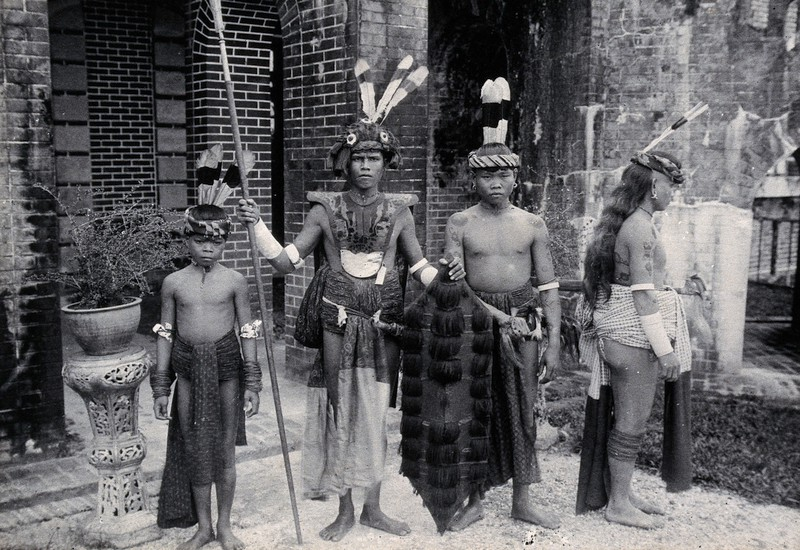
Sea Dayaks with weapons and head-dresses, c. 1896

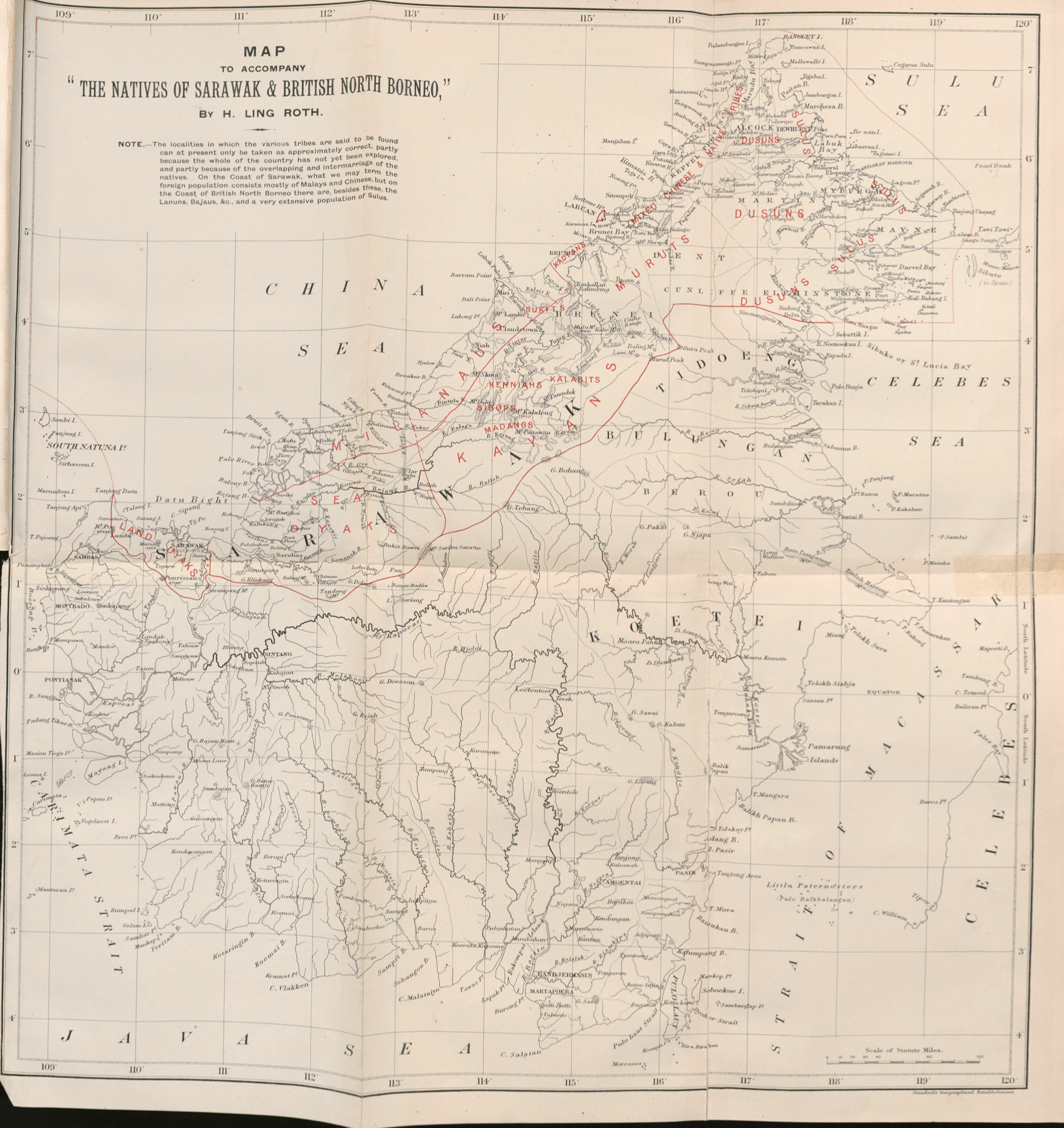
Ethnic composition map of the natives of Raj of Sarawak and the neighbouring British North Borneo, 1896

In 1841, Sarawak had an indigenous population of about 8,000. The Dayaks were the largest indigenous group in the interior: comprising Iban, Bidayuh and other interior tribes such as the Kayan, Kelabit, Kenyah, Lun Bawang and Penan, while coastal areas were dominated by the Sarawak local Malays, Melanau, and Kedayan. The government of Sarawak welcomed the migration of Chinese workers to boost the economy. Following various immigration schemes initiated by the Rajahs, the population increased to 150,000 in 1848, 300,000 in 1893, 475,000 in 1933, and 600,000 in 1945.

=== Water transport ===
Public infrastructure began to be given attention during the reign of Charles Brooke. The river systems in Sarawak are not inter-connected. As a result, coastal ships were used by the Brooke government to carry merchandise from one river system to another. The Brooke government also established a trade route from Kuching to Singapore, using its own ships such as The Royalist, Julia, and Swift. Among the early cargoe was antimony and gold. Borneo Company Limited bought another steamer, which they named the Sir James Brooke, to carry antimony, coal, and sago. The ships were the link between Sarawak and Singapore. Charles Brooke encouraged the Sarawak Chamber of Commerce to set up its own shipping lane to Singapore, offering to sell the Royalist to it. In 1875, the "Singapore and Sarawak Steamship Company" was formed and, shortly thereafter, bought the Royalist and the steamer Rajah Brooke. There were complaints that the company provided irregular services to its customers and, in 1908, the Brooke government transferred another two small steamships, the Adeh and Kaka, to the company in expectation of improvement. In 1919, Chinese interests bought the company's shares, liquidated it and formed a new company named the "Sarawak Steamship Company". The company established shipping lanes linking the Rajang, Limbang, and Baram river systems. The Sibu-Singapore shipping lane was started by the company but soon abandoned, being unprofitable. The establishment of the shipping lanes by Sarawak Steamship Company allowed the indigenous people to participate in wider markets, thus narrowing the income gap between urban and rural areas in Sarawak. The company suffered heavy losses in the trade depression of the 1920s and was acquired by the Singapore-based Straits Steamship Company. The company established branches at Sibu and Bintulu and installed agents at other small river ports.

=== Land transport ===
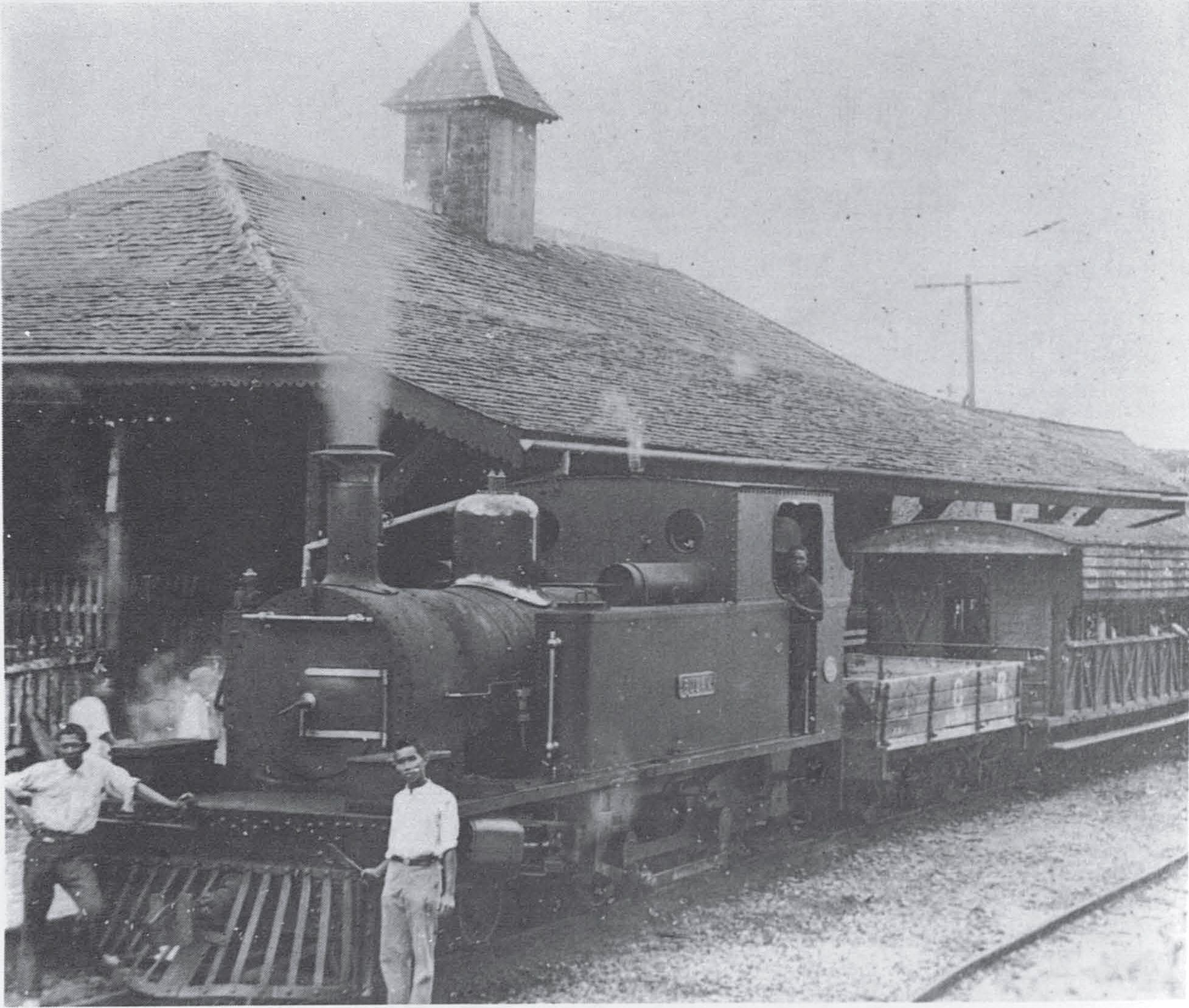
A locomotive named "Bulan" was installed after the government railway was opened in 1915.

Land transport in Sarawak was poorly developed owing to the swampy environment around rivers downstream, while dense jungles presented significant challenges to road construction inland. Most of the roads were constructed in coastal areas. Borneo Company Limited and Sarawak Oilfields also constructed a small number of short roads to serve their own economic interests. Meanwhile, in the interior, raised paths were made by the natives using logs to connect villages and their environs, easing access to farms and collection of forest produce. At the same time, rivers remained the most important means of transportation to coastal towns. In the first 70 years of Brooke rule, bridle paths were constructed to connect administrative posts to the surrounding districts. After the 1930s, the policy was changed to providing access from villages to navigable rivers. Most of the roads located near the towns were short, with the exception of the economically important Miri-Lutong road built by Sarawak Oilfields, the Jambusan road to Tegora via the Dahan estate, and Penrissen road built by the Brooke government. Together with the road developments, bullock carts were introduced together with porters, and hand carts in the mid-19th century, followed by rickshaws at the end of the 19th century, and bicycles in the early 20th century. Public motor services appeared in 1912 together with private taxis. In 1915, a short railway connecting Kuching to Tenth Mile (now Kota Padawan) was opened to the public. Subsequent construction of a road running parallel to the railway led to substantial losses, however, and its operations were limited to transportation of rocks from Seventh Mile (now Kota Sentosa) to Kuching.

=== Electricity and communication ===
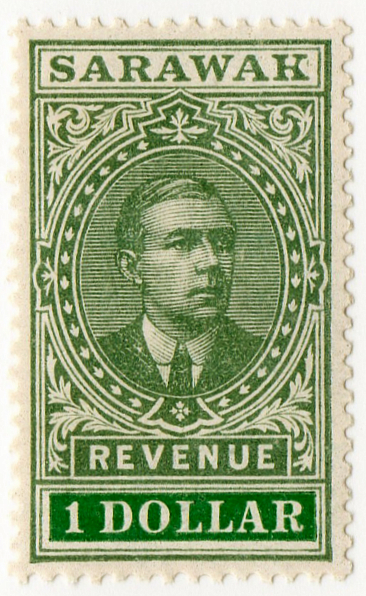
A $1 revenue stamp issued in 1918, featuring Charles Vyner Brooke

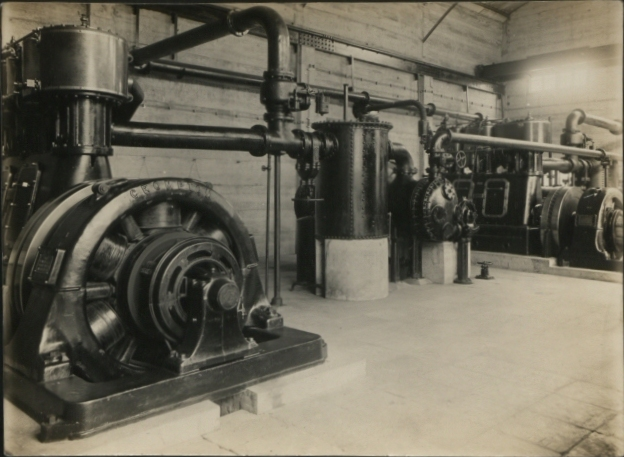
Belliss and Morcom engines in the coal-fired Kuching power station, 1922

In 1894, while plans for electric street lightning were being drawn up in Penang and Kuala Lumpur on the Malay Peninsula, Rajah Charles Brooke refused to adopt this new technology because of his dislike of "new-fangled things". The sparse population of Sarawak also presented a logistical challenge to install power stations and connecting cables. However, wired telephones were installed around Kuching in 1898 for keeping up to date communications with the outstations. Otherwise, messages from the northernmost areas of the state such as Limbang and Baram could take up to a month to reach Kuching. Besides, telephones were cheap to install and required little power. By 1908, the Mukah-Oya region was connected to telephone lines, followed by Miri in 1913, and Sibu in 1914. The first wireless telegraphy station was erected in Kuching in 1917, followed by Sibu and Miri immediately thereafter. It was not until 1914 that the first electrical power stations were installed in Miri by Anglo-Saxon Petroleum Company and Bau by the Borneo Company Limited. The oil production boom in Miri and gold mining in Bau gave rise to the need of more efficient lightning and motor systems. Cinematography also began that year in Miri. In 1920, J. R. Barnes, the manager of the Sarawak Government Wireless Telegraphs and Telephones Department, proposed an electrical lightning scheme for Kuching using a coal-fired system. In January 1923, a power station covering an area of 620 square metres (6,700 sq ft) was completed at Khoo Hun Yeang Street, Kuching, and started operation in June 1923, supplying Kuching with a direct current (DC) system. Today the road where the power station was once located is now known as the "Power Street". Sibu's first power station was installed in 1927, followed by Mukah in 1929. From 1922 to 1932, the electrical supply in Kuching was managed by the Electrical Department, under the jurisdiction of Public Works Department. This department was then privatised as the Sarawak Electricity Supply Company. From the 1930s, a telegraph line connected the country with Singapore. Wireless telegraph stations were located in all major towns in Sarawak. Postal service was also available throughout the administration.

=== Health ===
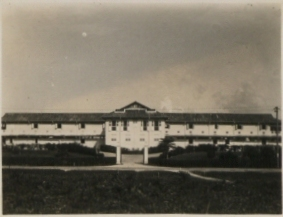
The Kuching General Hospital between 1900 and 1930

In 1915, Dr Ledingham Christie, surgeon to Borneo Company Limited, conducted a study regarding latent dysentery and parasitism amongst the Malay population staying near the Sarawak River. Those who had latent dysentery or parasites may not show any symptoms, but they may be pale and thin. The Malays at that time usually dumped their sewage into the river, while bathing or drinking from the same spot, believing that water currents would remove the waste. Among the 100 stool samples tested, whipworm (Trichuris trichiura) and roundworm (Ascaris lumbricoides) were most commonly found. Cholera was endemic in Sarawak; however very little is documented about the disease. The earliest cholera outbreak in Sarawak was in 1873 but it was not known how many died in it. In the same year, Captain Giles Helyer, the commander of the boat Heartsease, died of cholera. Meanwhile, the two children of Rajah James Brooke also died on board the SS Hydaspes, possibly due to cholera. In 1888, an outbreak occurred amongst a number of Malays in Simanggang District. In 1902, another cholera pandemic occurred with 1,500 deaths, at a time when an expeditionary force was organised by the Brookes to punish the Dayaks living in the rural areas of the Simanggang District. This was because the Dayaks were killing and attacking friendly neighbours. The epidemic caused the break-up of the expeditionary force without achieving any of its military objectives. There were also outbreaks in 1910 and 1911. No outbreaks were reported from 1911 to 1941.

The first doctor was appointed shortly after James Brooke was proclaimed Rajah. Kuching Hospital services existed in the 1800s but no records are available. The earliest record of the Kuching Hospital (now Sarawak General Hospital) was available in 1910 which shows it admitted 920 patients that year. In 1925, a leprosy settlement was constructed in Kuching. Rajah Charles Brooke Memorial Hospital was also constructed to treat leprosy patients. In 1931, a facility to treat mental illness was constructed beside the Kuching Hospital. In Sibu, the construction of Lau King Howe Hospital (now Lau King Howe Hospital Memorial Museum) was completed in 1936. In 1935, there were six doctors serving the needs of the senior government servants. The State Health Office (known as Medical Headquarters) was located at the Kuching Pavilion building from 1909 to 1947. There was only one assistant dental officer before the Japanese occupation. Charles Vyner Brooke had been attempting to persuade doctors from the Straits Settlements to serve in Sarawak but the response had been cold. The medical service continued under Japanese occupation. There are few records regarding the development of dentistry in the 1900s. Several accounts from elderly people stated that there were traditional healers and roadside tooth-pullers performing palliative treatments at that time. The first government dentist was appointed in July 1925 at Kuching General Hospital. In 1932, the "Sarawak Government Registration of Dentist Ordinance" was introduced. A total of 15 dentists were registered before the Japanese occupation.

=== Science ===
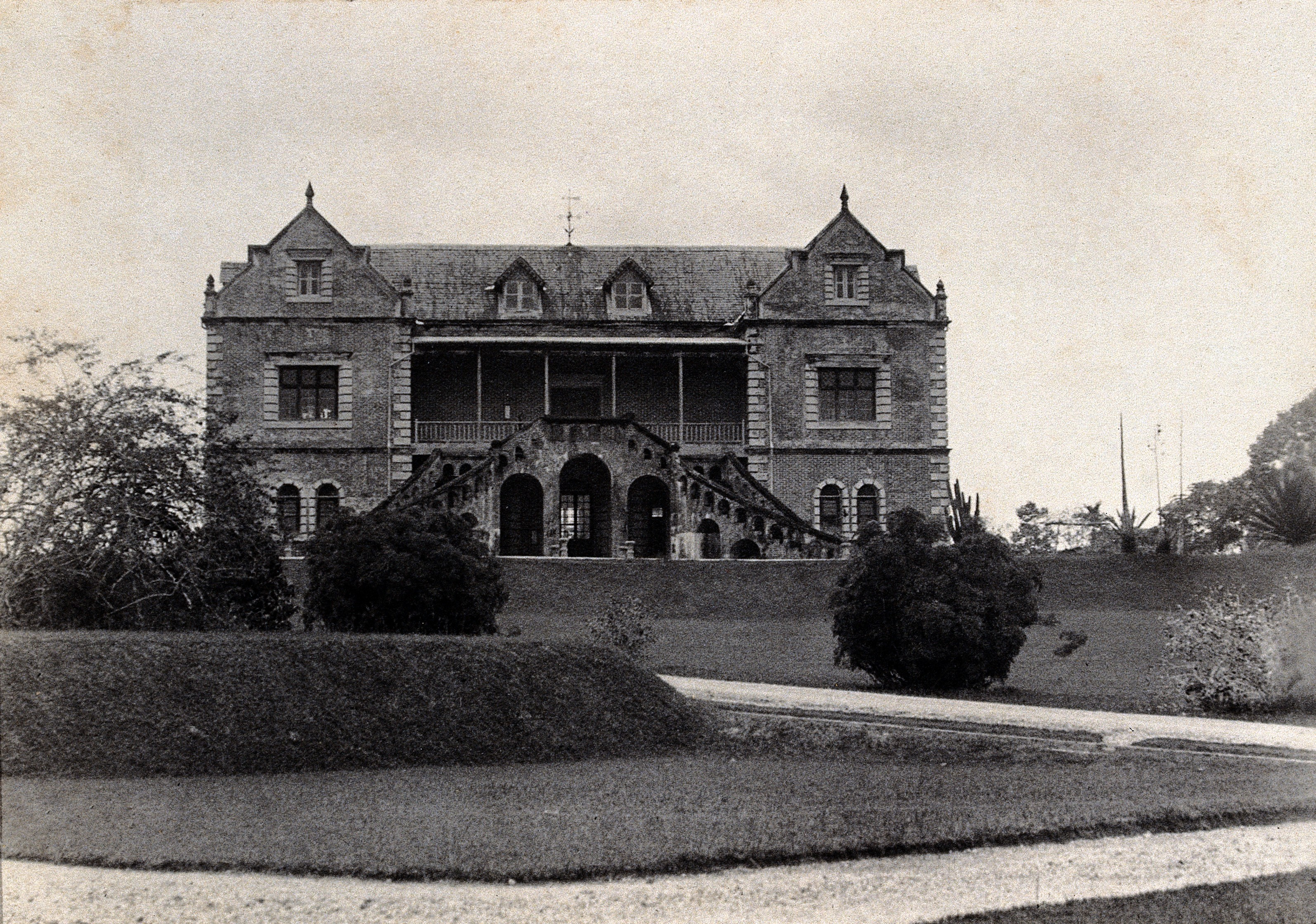
The Sarawak museum building in 1896

In 1854, Alfred Russel Wallace arrived in Kuching as a guest of James Brooke. In 1855, he wrote a paper entitled "On the law which has regulated the introduction of new species", also known as the "Sarawak Law", which anticipated aspects of Darwin's theory of evolution. The oldest museum in Borneo, the Sarawak State Museum, was constructed by Charles Brooke. Charles Hose, who served under Brooke as an administrator in the Baram region, was an avid photographer, naturalist, ethnologist, and author. He is credited with the discovery of various mammal and bird species endemic to Borneo: some of his specimens are now housed in London's Natural History Museum. His ethnological collections are in, amongst others, the British Museum.

=== Media ===
The Journal of the Royal Asiatic Society (since 1820), The London Gazette (since 1864), the Sarawak Gazette (since 1870), and the Sarawak Museum Journal (since 1911) hold a significant amount of information on Sarawak before and during the Rajahs administration.

== See also ==
- History of Sarawak
- List of British representatives in the Raj of Sarawak
- List of heads of government of the Raj of Sarawak
