= Sir Percy Cunynghame, 10th Baronet =

Scottish colonial administrator (1867–1941)

Sir Percy Francis Cunynghame, 10th Baronet of Milancraig OBE (21 February 1867 – 7 January 1941) was a Scottish colonial administrator who served as Resident, Sarawak on the staff of Sir Charles Brooke, Rajah of Sarawak.

== Early life ==
Cunynghame was born on 21 February 1867, the son of Sir Francis George Thurlow Cunynghame, 9th Baronet of Milncraig and Jessica Bloxsome, daughter of Rev. W. H. Bloxsome. He succeeded his father in the baronetcy in 1900.

== Career ==
In 1886, Cunynghame joined the Sarawak Civil Service and served in the Rajang. In 1888, he served as Sarawak consul in Labuan. From 1892 to 1902, he served as acting Resident of the 5th Division, Limbang, and from 1902 to 1904, Resident of the 3rd Division, Sibu.

In 1895, he accompanied the Raja on an expedition against the rebels led by the Orang Kaya Tumonhhong whom they captured at Medalam. In 1903, he led a successful raid against Dyak rebels in Batang Lupar district for which he was complimented by the Rajah, and in 1908, led a similar expedition in the same area with Sarawak Rangers having recently been appointed their Commandant.

In 1904, he was appointed Resident of the 1st Division at Kuching and Member of the Supreme Council. In 1906, the Rajah appointed him officer administering the Government during his absence giving him temporary control of Sarawak. He retired from the service in 1909, and went into business becoming chairman of United Malaysian Rubber Co Ltd.

During the First World War (1914–1918) he served in the 5th Battalion, Duke of Cambridge's Own (Middlesex Regiment), gained the rank of Lieutenant-Colonel, and was mentioned twice in dispatches.

He settled in England, and served as Deputy Lieutenant (1936) and JP for County London.

== Personal life and death ==
He married Maud Albinia, only child of Major Selwyn-Payne at Gloucester Cathedral in 1903, and they had two sons.

Cunynghame died on 7 January 1941, aged 73, and the funeral was held in Buckminster.

== Honours ==
Cunynghame was appointed Officer of the Order of the British Empire (OBE) in the 1919 New Year Honours.
