= Ride (2024 film) =

- Directed by: Jake Allyn
- Written by: Josh Plasse; Jake Allyn
- Produced by: Conor Allyn; Jake Allyn; Rob Allyn; Don Lepore; Josh Plasse; Keith J. Leman
- Starring: C. Thomas Howell; Annabeth Gish; Jake Allyn; Forrie J. Smith
- Cinematography: Keith J. Leman
- Edited by: Owen Jackson
- Music by: Those Who Ride With Giants
- Production companies: Margate House; Tacklebox Films; Pine Bay Pictures
- Distributed by: Well Go USA Entertainment
- Release date: 14 June 2024
- Running time: 114 minutes
- Country: United States
- Language: English

Ride is a 2024 American crime drama film written by Jake Allyn and Josh Plasse, directed by Allyn and starring C. Thomas Howell, Annabeth Gish, Allyn and Forrie J. Smith.

== Plot ==
Desperate to raise money for his daughter's cancer treatment, a retired bull rider teams up with his estranged son and resorts to robbery to secure payment before time runs out. But after the heist goes awry, keeping the money—and their freedom—requires the duo to outwit a dogged pair of local law enforcement officers, including a justice-minded sheriff who soon suspects that the key to her case may lie uncomfortably close to home.

== Cast ==
- C. Thomas Howell as John Hawkins
- Annabeth Gish as Monica Hawkins
- Jake Allyn as Peter
- Forrie J. Smith as Al
- Laci Kaye Booth as Libby
- Zia Carlock as Virginia Hawkins
- Scott Reeves as Ross Dickons
- Josh Plasse as Noah Hawkins
- Patrick Murney as Tyler

== Release ==
The film was released on June 14, 2024.

== Reception ==
The film has a 72% rating on Rotten Tomatoes based on 18 reviews. Sarah Little of Screen Rant awarded the film three and a half stars out of five. Marya E. Gates of RogerEbert.com awarded the film three stars.

Joe Leydon of Variety gave the film a positive review and wrote, "C. Thomas Howell and Forrie J. Smith give stand-out performances in director and star Jake Allyn’s suspenseful indie production."
