= Clean hands (disambiguation) =

Clean hands is a legal term, meaning to come to the Court to dispute but in good faith.

It may also refer to:

- "Clean Hands" (Flashpoint), an episode of Canadian TV series Flashpoint
- Clean Hands (2015 film), a Dutch crime film
- Clean Hands (2026 film), a biographical crime drama film by Jake Allyn
- Clean Hands Go Foul, an album by Khanate
- Clean Hands of Vojvodina, a Serbian political coalition
- Hand washing
- Mani pulite (Italian for "clean hands"), a judicial investigation into political corruption

== See also ==
- Dirty Hands (disambiguation)
