= Hearts of Freedom =

Hati Merdeka
- Directed by: Yadi Sugandi; Conor Allyn
- Written by: Conor Allyn; Rob Allyn
- Starring: Lukman Sardi; Donny Alamsyah; Darius Sinathrya; Teuku Rifnu Wikana; Rahayu Saraswati; Ranggani Puspandya; Astri Nurdin; Michael Bell; Aldy Zulfikar; Nugie
- Distributed by: Media Desa Indonesia; Margate House august first film studio Media Asia Group (hong kong)
- Release date: 9 June 2011
- Running time: 100 minutes
- Country: Indonesia
- Languages: Indonesian; Dutch
- Budget: IDR 60 Billion

Hearts of Freedom or Hati Merdeka, is a 2011 Indonesian drama fiction historical film and was the third film in the Merah Putih trilogy. The first was Merah Putih, followed by Darah Garuda. The films describe how a group of Indonesian army cadets fight for freedom from Dutch colonialism. This film is an adaptation of the Japanese propaganda film Hati Merdeka by Andreas Liong and Ignatius Matulessy in 1944.

== Context ==
Set during the revolution in early 1948, HEARTS OF FREEDOM follows a band of cadets who become elite guerrilla soldiers following a 1947 massacre of their cadet classmates (a story based on the real-life battle that killed both of Hashim's uncles in Lengkong in 1946).

== Plot ==
After completing a tragic mission in which one of the band's most beloved members is killed, the band's loyalty to the cause is put to the ultimate test when their leader, Amir (Lukman Sardi) resigns from the Army in disgust. Leaderless and heartsick over their losses, the cadets carry their vendetta for revenge against the Dutch to the high seas in a dangerous mission to Bali, home island of the maimed mute Dayan (T. Rifnu Wikana), where they are sent to kill the Dutch militia Colonel Raymer (Michael Bell), who murdered the family of the band's new leader Tomas (Donny Alamsyah) in the opening of RED AND WHITE. Facing the cannons of a Dutch PT boat, the hard-drinking playboy Marius (Darius Sinathrya) must overcome his fears as he rivals Tomas for the affections of the starchy aristocrat's daughter Senja (Rahayu Saraswati).

Arriving in Bali, the band saves the woman Dayu (new cast member Ranggani Puspandya) from the ravages of Colonel Raymer's KNIL militia, but one of the heroes is nearly killed. As their friend hovers between life and death, the band finds the caves of rebel leader Wayan Suta (played by the singer Nugie). Tomas clashes with their former commander, Amir (Lukman Sardi) as they plan a final assault against Raymer's militia, raising the question: how far can the revolution go to defeat evil, and still retain its ideals?

== Cast ==
- Lukman Sardi as Amir
- Darius Sinathrya as Marius
- Donny Alamsyah as Thomas
- Teuku Rifnu Wikana as Dayan
- Rahayu Saraswati as Senja
- Astri Nurdin as Melati
- Ranggani Puspandya as Dayu
- Nugie as Wayan Suta
- Agung Udijana as Sumarjo
