= Asiana Airlines Flight 214 =

2013 aircraft accident in California

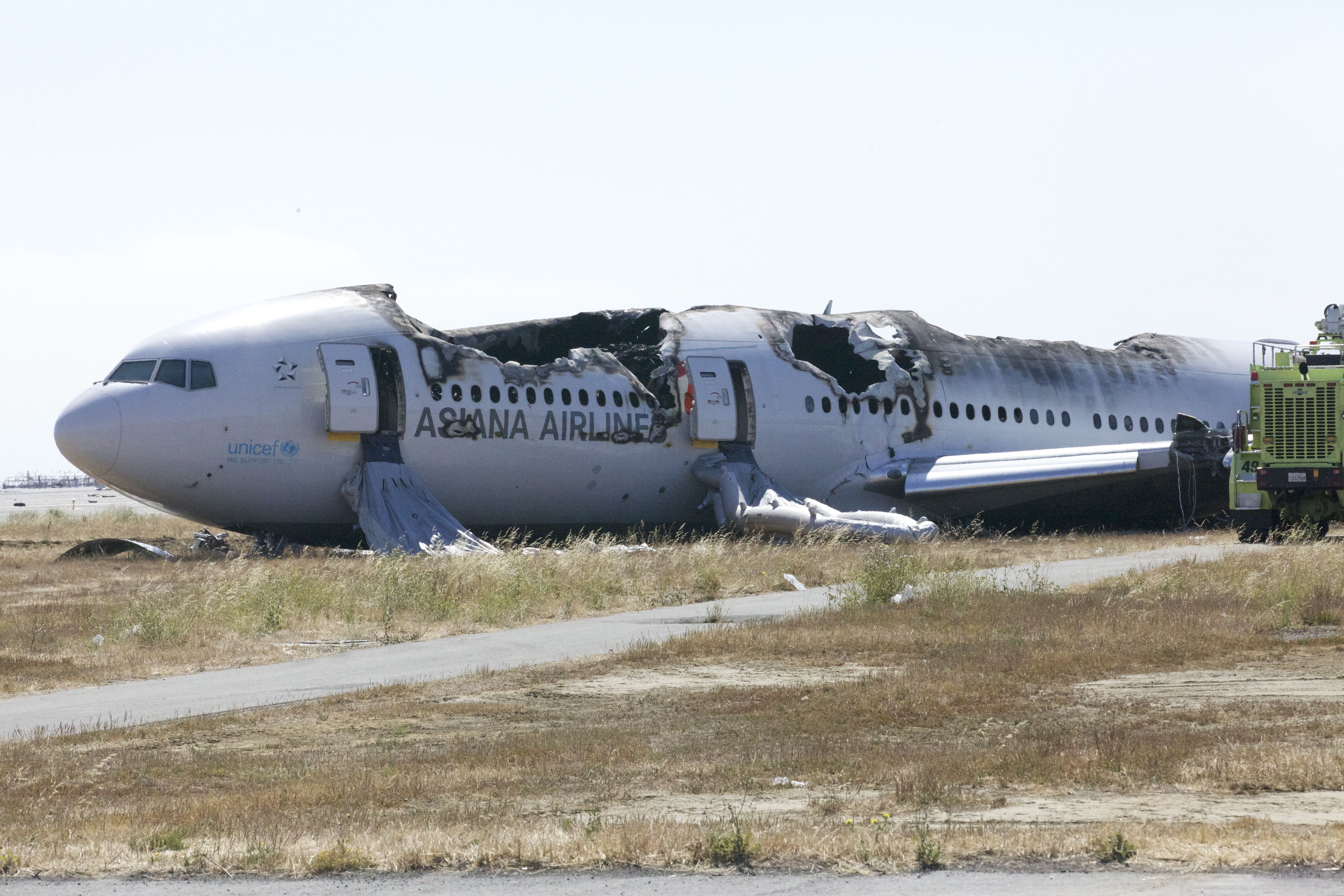
- Wreckage of the aircraft at San Francisco International Airport

Accident
- Date: July 6, 2013
- Summary: Crashed on landing due to unstable approach caused by pilot error
- Site: San Francisco International Airport, Millbrae, California, United States; 37°36′48″N 122°21′52″W

Aircraft
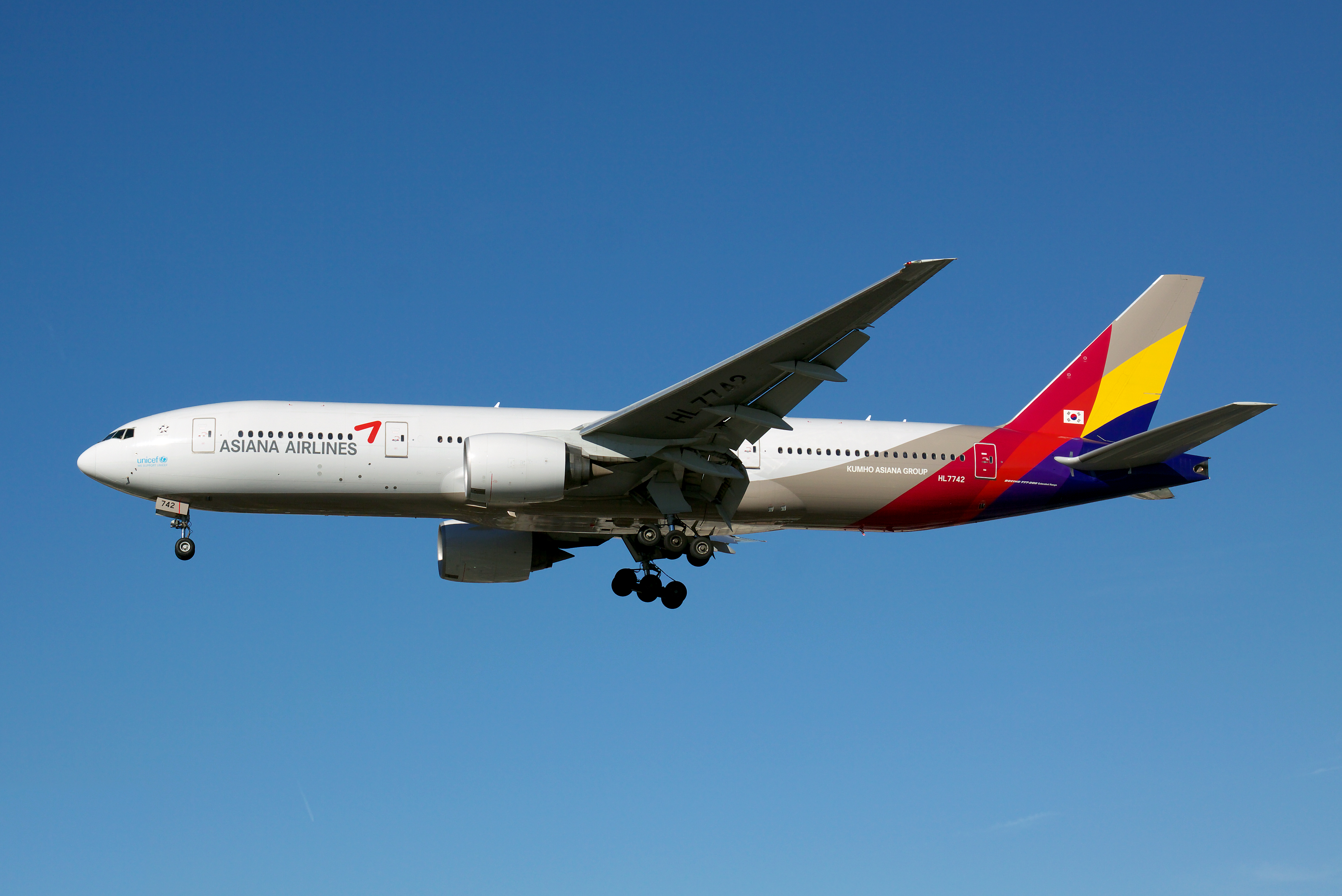
- HL7742, the aircraft involved in the accident, photographed in 2012
- Aircraft type: Boeing 777-28EER (Note: The airliner was a Boeing 777-200ER model, with "ER" denoting the Extended Range variant. Boeing assigns a unique code for each company that buys one of its airliners, which is applied as a suffix to the model number at the time the aircraft is built, hence "777-28EER" designates a 777-200ER built for Asiana Airlines (customer code 8E).)
- Operator: Asiana Airlines
- IATA flight No.: OZ214
- ICAO flight No.: AAR214
- Call sign: ASIANA 214
- Registration: HL7742
- Flight origin: Incheon International Airport, Incheon, South Korea
- Destination: San Francisco International Airport, Millbrae, California, United States
- Occupants: 307
- Passengers: 291
- Crew: 16
- Fatalities: 3
- Injuries: 187
- Survivors: 304

Asiana Airlines Flight 214 was a scheduled transpacific passenger flight originating from Incheon International Airport near Seoul, South Korea, to San Francisco International Airport (SFO) near San Francisco, California, United States, that crashed on final approach into SFO's Runway 28L on the morning of July 6, 2013. The Boeing 777-200ER operating the flight, registered as HL7742, approached too slowly and crashed at an angle into the seawall before the threshold of Runway 28L. The tail, main landing gear, and left engine separated, while the remaining fuselage slid along the runway before coming to a stop and catching fire.

Of the 307 people on board, three were killed; another 187 occupants were injured, 49 of them seriously. Among the seriously injured were four flight attendants who were thrown onto the runway while still strapped in their seats when the tail section broke off after striking the seawall short of the runway. This was the first fatal crash of a Boeing 777 since the aircraft type entered service in 1995, and the first fatal crash of a passenger airliner on U.S. soil since the crash of Colgan Air Flight 3407 in 2009.

The investigation by the U.S. National Transportation Safety Board (NTSB) concluded that the accident was caused by the flight crew's mismanagement of the aircraft's final approach. Deficiencies in Boeing's documentation of complex flight control systems and in Asiana Airlines' pilot training were also cited as contributory factors.

== Background ==
=== Aircraft ===
The Boeing 777-28EER involved, MSN 29171, registered as HL7742, was powered by two Pratt and Whitney PW4090 engines. The aircraft was manufactured in 2006 and was delivered to Asiana Airlines on March 7, 2006. At the time of the accident, the plane had accumulated 37,120 flight hours and 5,388 takeoff-and-landing cycles.

This was the 777's first fatal accident, second crash (after British Airways Flight 38), and third hull loss since it began operating commercially in 1995.

=== Crew and passengers ===
==== Crew ====
The aircrew consisted of three captains and one first officer. Captain Lee Jeong-min, 49 years old, was in the right seat (first officer position) and filled the dual role of a check/instructor captain. As pilot in command, he was responsible for the safe operation of the flight. He had 12,387 hours of flying experience, of which 3,220 hours were in a 777. This was his first flight as an instructor.

Lee Kang-kook, 45 years old, was in the left seat (captain position) and was the pilot flying. He was receiving his initial operating experience (IOE) training and was halfway through Asiana's IOE requirements. He had 9,793 hours of flying experience, of which 43 were in a 777 over nine flights operating the controls under the supervision of the instructor captain in the right seat.

At the time of the crash, relief first officer Bong Dong-won, 40 years old, was observing from the cockpit jump seat. He had 4,557 hours of flying experience, of which 715 hours were in a 777. Relief Captain Lee Jong-joo, 52 years old, occupied a business-class seat in the passenger cabin.

After the crash, Bong received medical treatment for a cracked rib; none of the other pilots needed hospital care.

Four flight attendants seated at the rear were ejected from the aircraft when the tail section broke off, but they survived. Twelve flight attendants were on board, 10 South Korean and two Thai. Six flight attendants received physical and emotional treatment. The other six returned to South Korea.

Nationalities of passengers and crew
Nationality	Passengers	Crew	Total	Deaths	Survivors
China	141	0	141	3	138
South Korea	77	14	91	0	91
United States	64	0	64	0	64
Canada	3	0	3	0	3
India	3	0	3	0	3
Thailand	0	2	2	0	2
France	1	0	1	0	1
Japan	1	0	1	0	1
Vietnam	1	0	1	0	1
Total	291	16	307	3	304

==== Passengers ====
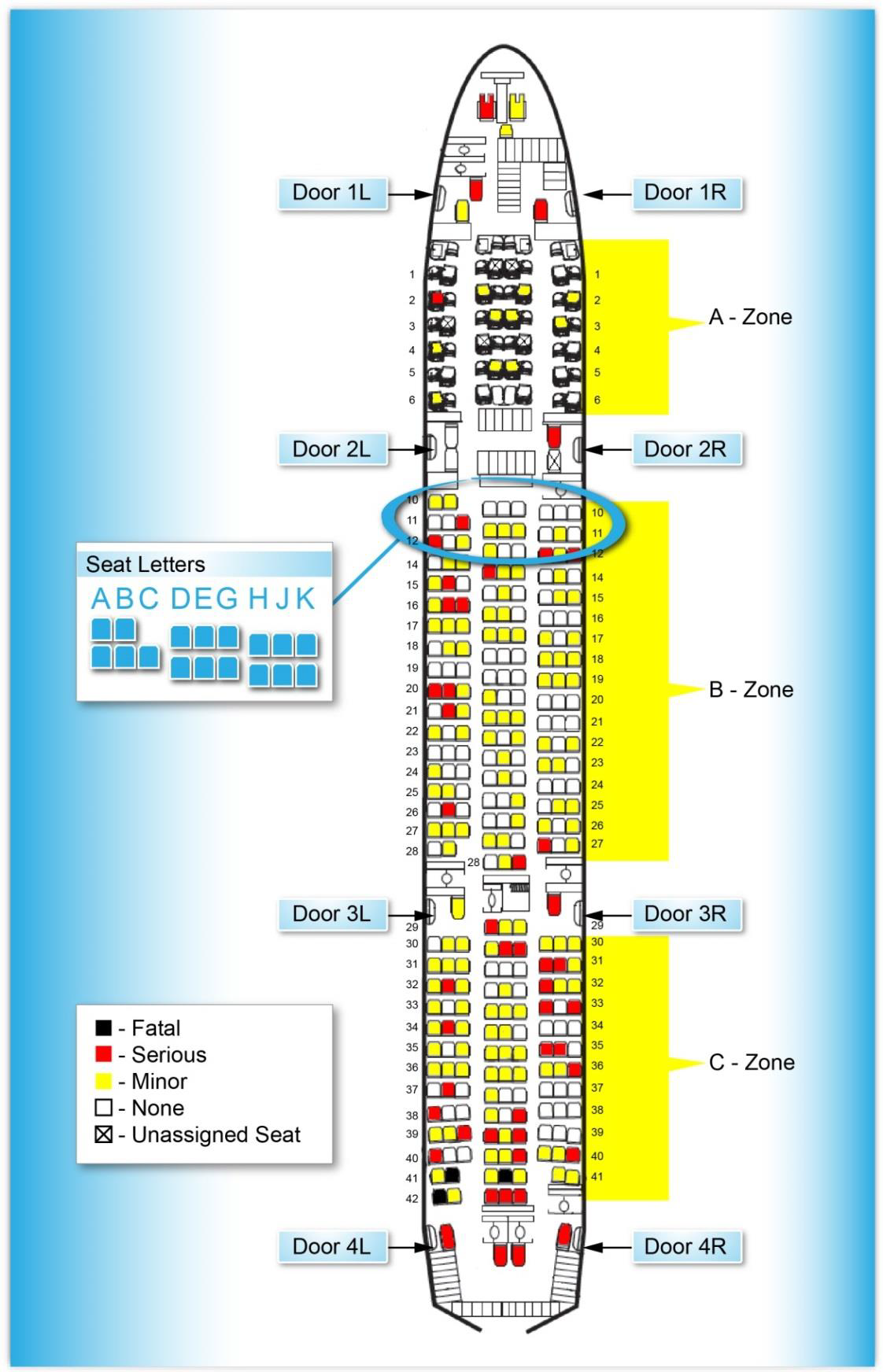
Seat map indicating injuries and deaths

Wang Linjia and Ye Mengyuan, both Chinese nationals, were found dead outside the aircraft soon after the crash after having been ejected from the plane during the crash. Neither victim was wearing a seatbelt. Experts concluded Wang and Ye likely would have survived the plane crash had they been wearing their seatbelts. On July 19, 2013, the San Mateo County Coroner's office initially determined that Ye was still alive when she was run over by a rescue vehicle and was killed from the resulting traumas. Later investigations concluded that Ye was already dead from severe injuries caused by being ejected from the aircraft.

A third passenger, Liu Yipeng, died of her injuries at San Francisco General Hospital six days after the accident. Liu had been wearing her seatbelt while seated in 42A, which is on the last row of passenger seats on the left side of the aircraft, immediately ahead of door 4L. During the crash, the back of Liu's seat rotated back and against the floor, leaving her exposed. Her injuries were likely the result of having been struck by door 4L, which separated during the aircraft's final impact.

Ten people in critical condition were admitted at San Francisco General Hospital and 55 were sent to Stanford Medical Center. Nine hospitals in the area admitted a total of 182 injured people. San Francisco Fire Department chief Joanne Hayes-White, after checking with two intake points at the airport, told reporters that all on board had been accounted for.

Of the passengers, 141 (almost half) were Chinese citizens. More than 90 of them had boarded Asiana Airlines Flight 362 from Shanghai Pudong International Airport, connecting to Flight 214 at Incheon. Incheon serves as a major connecting point between China and North America. In July 2013, Asiana Airlines operated between Incheon (Seoul) and 21 cities in mainland China.

Seventy students and teachers traveling to the United States for summer camp were among the Chinese passengers. Thirty of the students and teachers were from Shanxi, and the others were from Zhejiang. Five of the teachers and 29 of the students were from Jiangshan High School in Zhejiang; they were traveling together. Thirty-five of the students were to attend a West Valley Christian School summer camp. The Shanxi students originated from Taiyuan, with 22 students and teachers from the Taiyuan Number Five Secondary School and 14 students and teachers from the Taiyuan Foreign Language School. The three passengers who died were in the Jiangshan High School group to West Valley camp.

== Accident ==
On July 6, 2013, Flight OZ214 took off from Incheon International Airport (ICN) at 5:04 p.m. KST (08:04 UTC), 34 minutes after its scheduled departure time. It was scheduled to land at San Francisco International Airport (SFO) at 11:04 a.m. PDT (18:04 UTC). The flight was uneventful until its landing.

The instrument landing system's (ILS) vertical guidance (glide slope) on Runway 28L was unavailable, as it had been taken out of service on June 1. A notice to airmen (Notam) to that effect had been issued. Therefore, a precision ILS approach to the runway was not possible.

The flight was cleared for a visual approach to Runway 28L at 11:21 a.m. PDT and was told to maintain a speed of 180 knots (330 km/h; 210 mph) until the aircraft was 5 nautical miles [nmi] (9.3 km; 5.8 mi) from the runway. At 11:26 a.m., Northern California TRACON ("NorCal Approach") handed the flight off to San Francisco tower. A tower controller acknowledged the second call from the crew at 11:27 a.m. when the plane was 1.5 miles (2.4 km; 1.3 nmi) away and gave clearance to land.

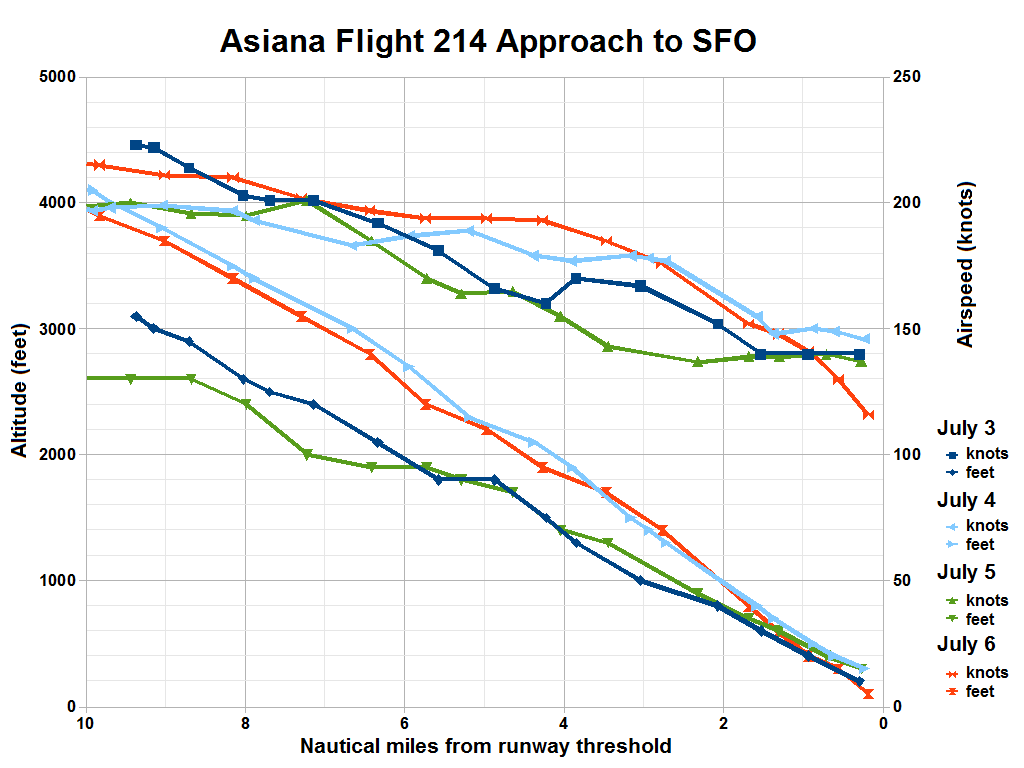
Four consecutive days of Flight(s) 214 final approach airspeeds and glide paths (July 6 crash flight shown in red).

The weather was very good; the latest METAR reported light wind, 10 miles (16 km) visibility (the maximum it can report), no precipitation, and no forecast or reports of wind shear. The pilots performed a visual approach assisted by the runway's precision approach path indicator (PAPI).

Preliminary analysis indicated that the plane's approach was too slow and too low. Eighty-two seconds before impact, at an altitude of about 1,600 feet (490 m), the autopilot was turned off, the throttles were set to idle, and the plane was operated manually during final descent. NTSB chair Deborah Hersman stated the pilots did not "set the aircraft for an auto-land situation ... They had been cleared for a visual approach and they were hand-flying the airplane", adding: "During the approach there were statements made in the cockpit first about being above the glide path, then about being on the glide path, then later reporting about being below the glide path. All of these statements were made as they were on the approach to San Francisco..." Based on preliminary data from the flight data recorder (FDR), the NTSB found that the plane's airspeed on final approach had fallen well below its target approach speed. A preliminary review of FAA radar return data did not show an abnormally steep descent curve, although the crew did recognize that they began high on the final approach.

At a height of 125 feet (38 m), eight seconds before impact, the airspeed had dropped to 112 knots (207 km/h; 129 mph). According to initial reports from the cockpit crew, the plane's autothrottle was set for the correct reference speed, but until the runway's precision approach path indicator (PAPI) showed them significantly below the glide path, the pilots were unaware that the autothrottle was failing to maintain that speed. The instructor pilot stated that the PAPI indicated a deviation below the glide path at approximately 500 ft (150 m) above ground level, and he attempted to correct it at that time. Between 500 and 200 ft (152 and 61 m), the instructor pilot also reported a lateral deviation that the crew attempted to correct. Seven seconds before impact, one pilot called for an increase in speed. The FDR showed the throttles were advanced from idle at that time. The instructor pilot reported that he had called for an increase in speed, but that the pilot flying had already advanced the throttles by the time that he reached for the throttles. The sound of the stick shaker (warning of imminent stall) could be heard four seconds before impact on the cockpit voice recorder. Airspeed reached a minimum of 103 knots (191 km/h; 119 mph) (34 knots below the target speed) three seconds before impact, with engines at 50% power and increasing. The co-pilot called for a go-around 1.5 seconds before impact. At impact, airspeed had increased to 106 knots (196 km/h; 122 mph).

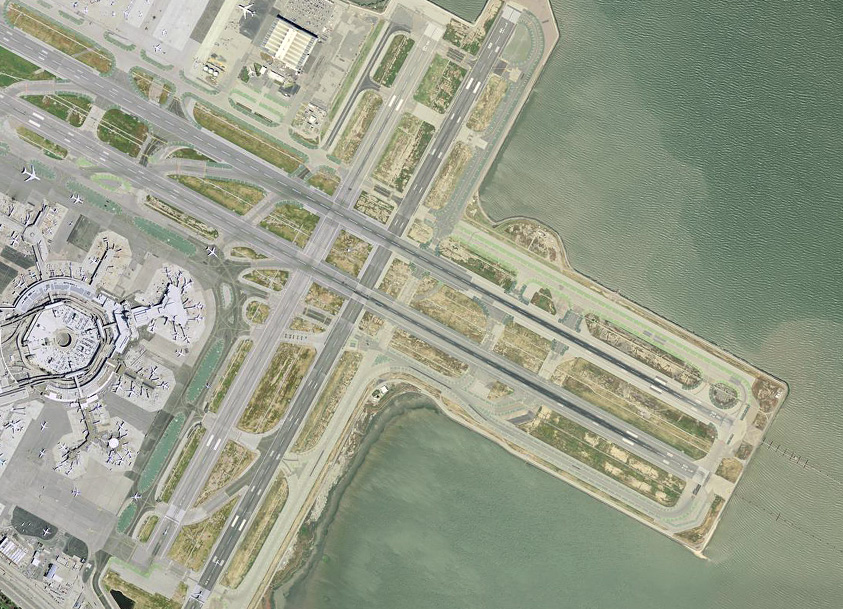
Approximate locations of the wreckage. The arrow indicates the flight direction before impact.

At 11:28 a.m., the plane crashed short of Runway 28L's threshold. The landing gear and tail struck the seawall that projects into San Francisco Bay. The left engine and the tail section separated from the aircraft. The NTSB noted that the main landing gear, the first part of the aircraft to hit the seawall, "separated cleanly from [the] aircraft as designed" to protect the wing fuel tank structure. The vertical and both horizontal stabilizers fell on the runway before the threshold.

The remainder of the fuselage and wings rotated counter-clockwise approximately 330 degrees as the plane slid westward. Video showed it pivoting about the wing and the nose while sharply inclined to the ground. It came to rest to the left of the runway, 2,400 ft (730 m) from the initial point of impact at the seawall.

After a minute or so, a dark plume of smoke was observed rising from the wreckage. The fire was traced to a ruptured oil tank above the right engine. The leaking oil fell onto the hot engine and ignited. The fire was not fed by jet fuel. All three fire handles were extended; these operate safety equipment intended to extinguish fires on the aircraft (a handle for each engine and the auxiliary power unit). The speedbrake lever was down, showing that it was not being used.

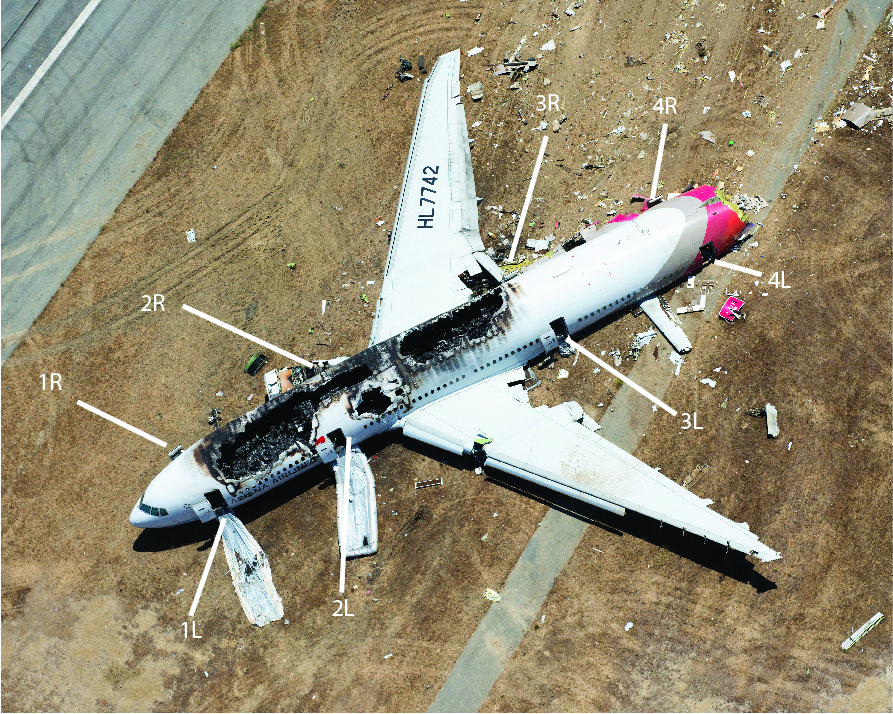
Final position of plane with exit doors marked

Two evacuation slides were deployed on the left side of the airliner and used for evacuation. Despite damage to the aircraft, "many ... were able to walk away on their own." The slides for the first and second doors on the right side of the aircraft (doors 1R and 2R) deployed inside the aircraft during the crash, pinning the flight attendants seated nearby.

According to NBC reports in September 2013, the U.S. government had been concerned about the reliability of evacuation slides for decades: "Federal safety reports and government databases reveal that the NTSB has recommended multiple improvements to escape slides and that the Federal Aviation Administration has collected thousands of complaints about them." Two months before the accident at SFO, the FAA issued an airworthiness directive ordering inspection of the slide-release mechanism on certain Boeing 777 aircraft in order to detect and correct corrosion that might interfere with slide deployment.

This was the third fatal crash in Asiana's 25-year history.

== Survivor and eyewitness accounts ==
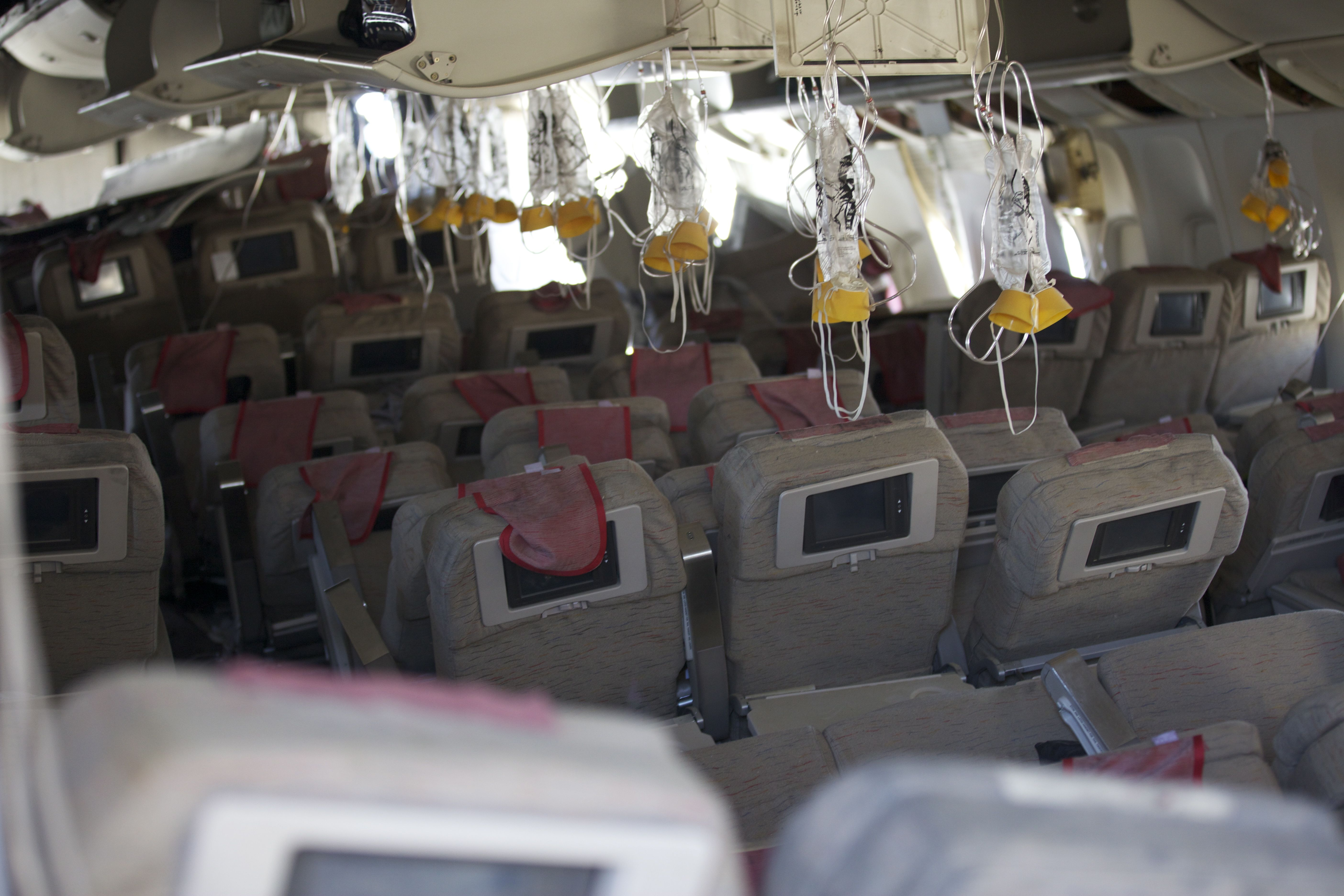
The rear cabin after the crash

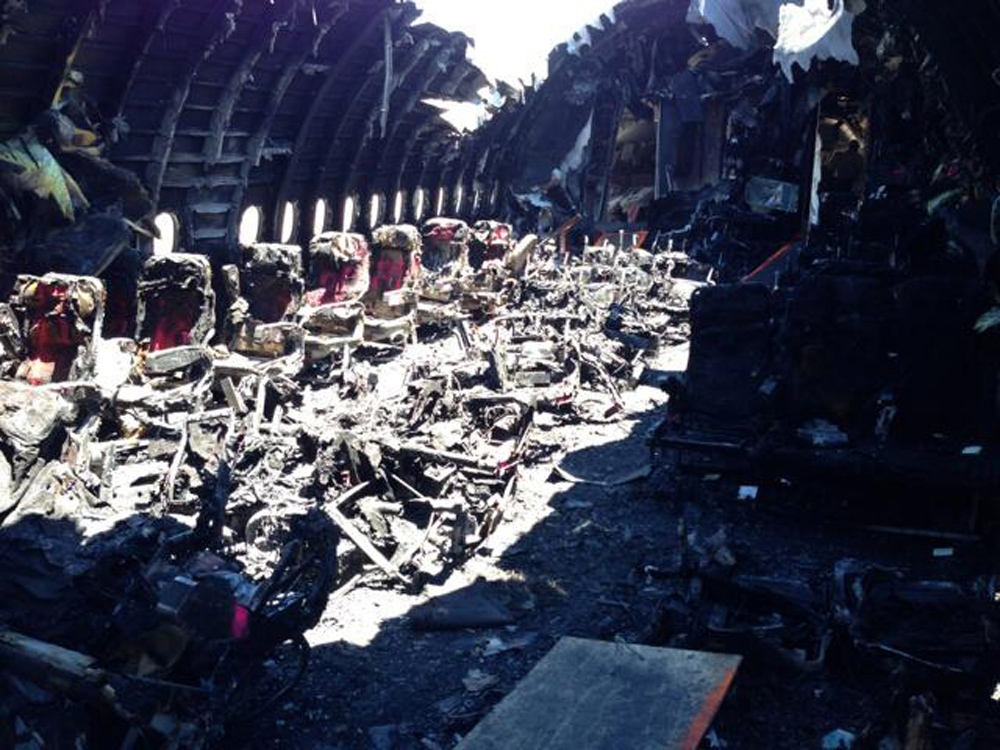
The charred middle cabin after the crash and fire

Several passengers recalled noticing the plane's unusual proximity to the water on final approach, which caused water to thrust upward as the engines were spooling up in the final seconds before impact.

In the initial moments after the crash, the cockpit crew told flight attendants to delay evacuating the aircraft as they were communicating with the tower. A flight attendant seated at the second door on the left side (door 2L) observed fire outside the aircraft near row 10 and informed the cockpit crew, and the evacuation order was then given, approximately 90 seconds after the aircraft had come to rest. Flight attendants told NTSB investigators that there was no fire inside the cabin when the evacuation began.

The crew also helped several passengers who were unable to escape on their own, and a pilot carried out one passenger with an injured leg. One flight attendant said that many Chinese passengers who sat at the back of the plane near the third exit were not aware of the evacuation.

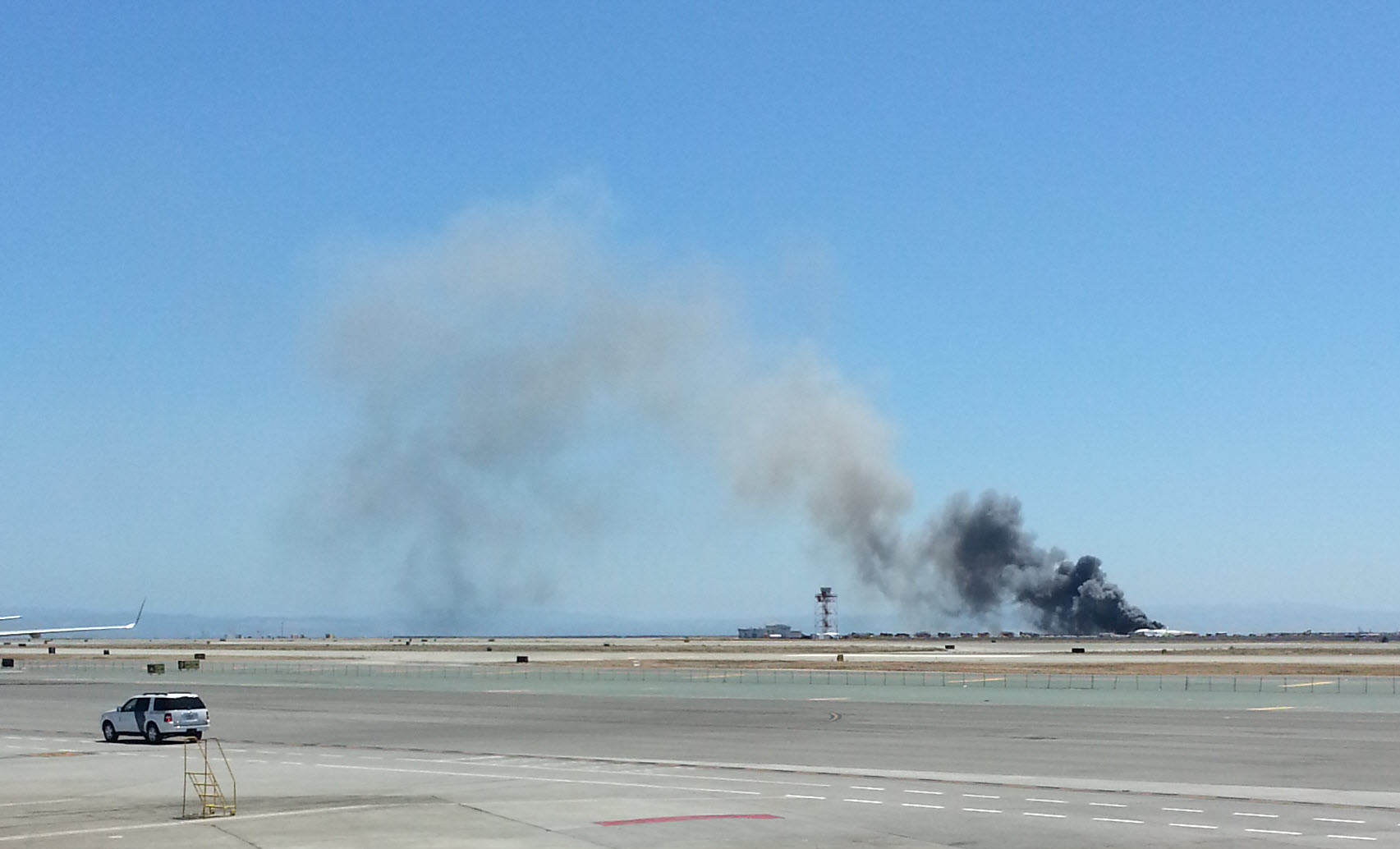
Smoke rising from the crash site as seen from Terminal 1

During the evacuation, a pilot used an extinguisher on a fire that had penetrated from the exterior to the inside of the cabin.

During the crash, two of the evacuation slides inflated into the cabin. One slide blocked the forward right exit and nearly suffocated a flight attendant before being deflated by a pilot with a crash axe from the cockpit. The second chute expanded toward the center of the aircraft near the fire. It trapped a second flight attendant until a pilot deflated it with a table knife.

Some passengers sitting at the rear of the aircraft escaped through the hole left by the missing tail section.

Eyewitnesses to the crash included the cockpit crew and many passengers on board United Airlines Flight 885, a Boeing 747-400 that was holding on Taxiway F, next to the runway. Others saw it from the terminal and near the airport. At least one person recorded it on video. Writing on the Professional Pilots Rumour Network internet forum, the first officer of UA 885 described what he saw:

I then noticed at the apparent descent rate and closure to the runway environment the aircraft looked as though it was going to impact the approach lights mounted on piers in the SF Bay. The aircraft made a fairly drastic-looking pull up in the last few feet and it appeared and sounded as if they had applied maximum thrust. However the descent path they were on continued and the thrust applied didn't appear to come soon enough to prevent impact. The tail cone and empennage of the 777 impacted the bulkhead seawall and departed the airplane and the main landing gear sheared off instantly.

— United Flight 885 first officer, "Inside United Flight 885: A Pilot's Gripping Account", Chicago Business Journal

Passengers and others praised the flight attendants' conduct after the crash. Lee Yoon-hye, the aircraft's cabin manager (the chief flight attendant) was the last to leave the burning plane. San Francisco fire chief Hayes-White praised Lee's courage, saying, "She wanted to make sure that everyone was off. ... She was a hero."

A firefighter who entered the cabin said that the back of the plane had suffered structural damage, but that the seats near the front "were almost pristine" before the cabin fire.

== Investigation ==
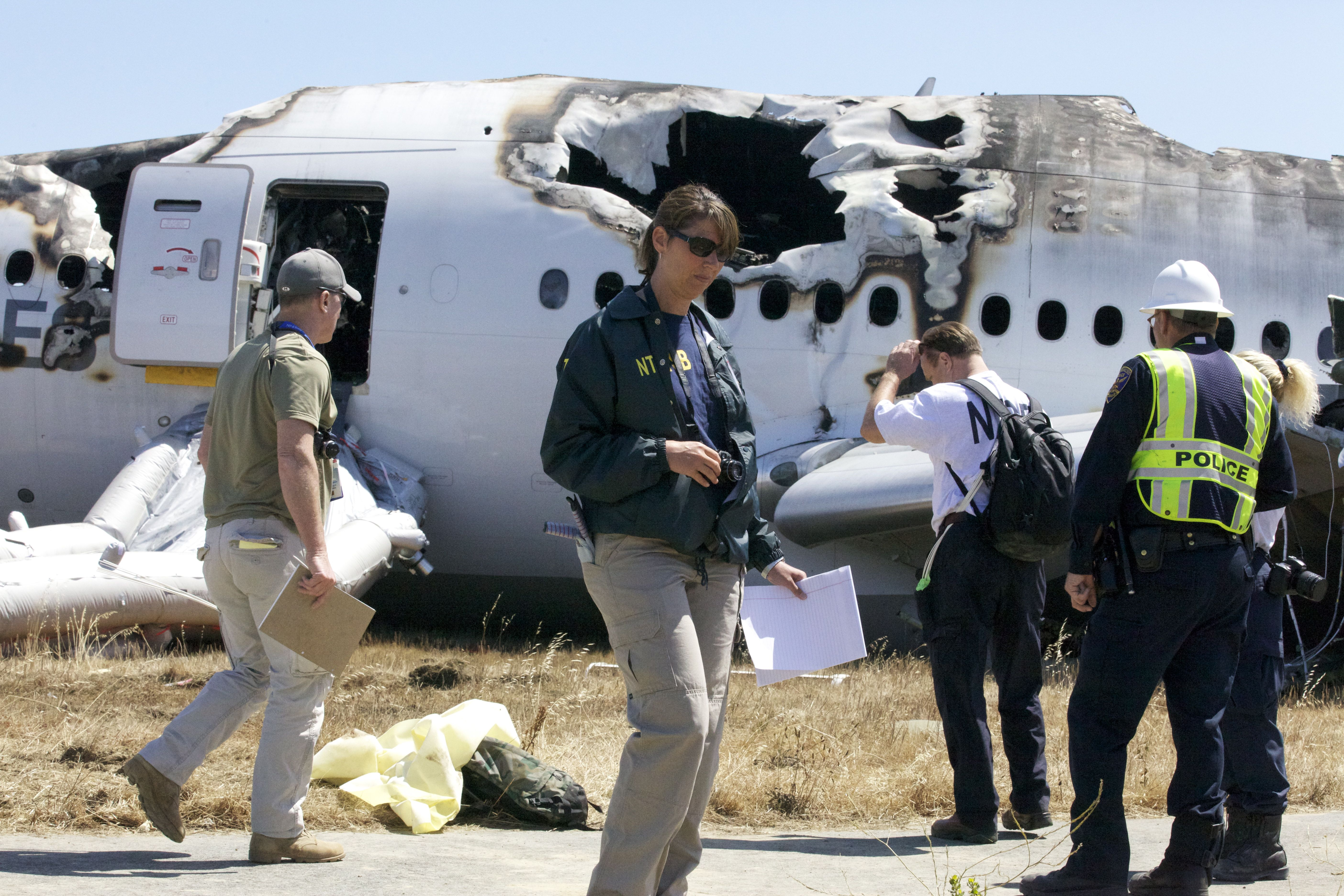
NTSB investigators at the crash site

The National Transportation Safety Board (NTSB) sent a team of 20 to the scene to investigate. On July 7, 2013, NTSB investigators recovered the flight data recorder and cockpit voice recorder and transported them to Washington, D.C., for analysis. Additional parties to the investigation include the Federal Aviation Administration, airframe manufacturer Boeing, engine manufacturer Pratt & Whitney, and the Korean Aviation and Railway Accident Investigation Board (ARAIB). ARAIB's technical adviser is Asiana Airlines.

Hersman said that the NTSB conducted a four-hour interview with each pilot, adding that the pilots were open and cooperative. She said both pilots at the controls had ample rest before they left South Korea and during the flight when they were relieved by the backup crew. All three pilots told NTSB investigators that they were relying on the 777's automated devices for speed control during final descent. The relief first officer also stated to NTSB investigators that he had called out "sink rate" to call attention to the rate at which the plane was descending during the final approach. This "sink rate" warning was repeated several times during the last minute of the descent. ARAIB tested the pilots for drug use four weeks after the accident; the tests proved negative.

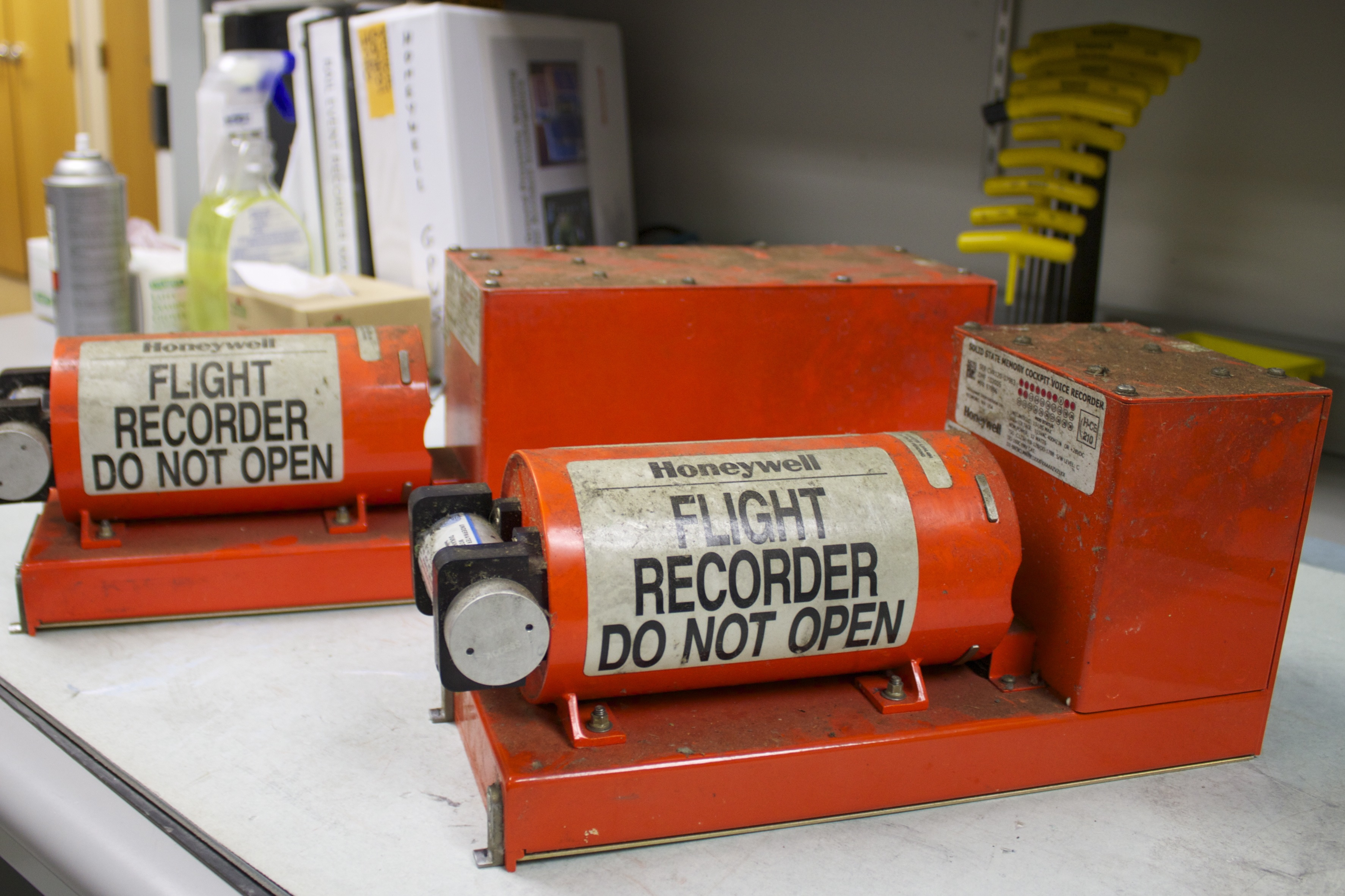
The flight data recorder (left) and cockpit voice recorder were recovered from the aircraft undamaged.

The NTSB's investigative team completed the examination of the aircraft wreckage and runway. The wreckage was removed to a secure storage location at San Francisco International Airport. The Airplane Systems, Structures, Powerplants, Airplane Performance, and Air Traffic Control investigative groups completed their on-scene work. The Flight Data Recorder and Cockpit Voice Recorder groups completed their work in Washington. The Survival Factors/Airport group completed their interviews of the first responders. The next phase of the investigation included additional interviews, examination of the evacuation slides and other airplane components, and a more detailed analysis of the airplane's performance. Based on a preliminary review of FDR data, the NTSB stated there was no anomalous behavior of the engines, the autopilot, the flight director, or the autothrottle. The autothrottle control was found to be in the "armed" position during documentation of cockpit levers and switches, differing from both the "on" and "off" positions. Furthermore, the pilot flying's flight director was deactivated whereas the instructor pilot's was activated. Significantly, deactivating neither or both flight directors enables and forces an autothrottle "wake-up" whereas deactivating only one flight director inhibits an autothrottle "wake-up".

Hersman said: "In this flight, in the last 2.5 minutes of the flight, from data on the flight data recorder we see multiple autopilot modes and multiple autothrottle modes ... We need to understand what those modes were, if they were commanded by pilots, if they were activated inadvertently, if the pilots understood what the mode was doing." Hersman has repeatedly emphasized it is the pilot's responsibility to monitor and maintain correct approach speed and that the crew's actions in the cockpit are the primary focus of the investigation.

NTSB animation reconstructing the failed descent

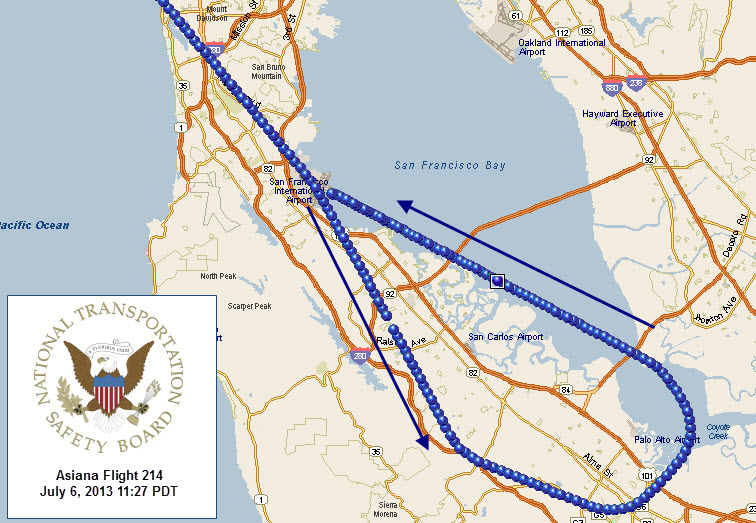
Descent flight path

The final report into the crash was released on June 24, 2014. The NTSB found that the "Mismanagement of Approach and Inadequate Monitoring of Airspeed led to the Crash of Asiana flight 214". The NTSB determined that the flight crew mismanaged the initial approach and that the airplane was well above the desired glidepath. In response, the captain selected an inappropriate autopilot mode (FLCH, or Flight Level Change) which resulted in the autothrottle no longer controlling airspeed. The aircraft then descended below the desired glidepath with the crew unaware of the decreasing airspeed. The attempted go-around was conducted below 100 feet (30 m), by which time it was too late. Over-reliance on automation and lack of systems understanding by the pilots were cited as major factors contributing to the accident.

The NTSB further determined that the pilot's faulty mental model of the airplane's automation logic led to his inadvertent deactivation of automatic airspeed control. In addition, Asiana's automation policy emphasized the full use of all automation and did not encourage manual flight during line operations. The flight crew's mismanagement of the airplane's vertical profile during the initial approach led to a period of increased workload that reduced the monitoring pilot's awareness of the flying pilot's actions around the time of the unintended deactivation of automatic airspeed control. Insufficient flight crew monitoring of airspeed indications during the approach likely resulted from expectancy, increased workload, fatigue, and automation reliance. Lack of compliance with standard operating procedures and crew resource management were cited as additional factors.

The NTSB reached the following final conclusion:

The National Transportation Safety Board determines that the probable cause of this accident was the flight crew's mismanagement of the airplane's descent during the visual approach, the pilot flying's unintended deactivation of automatic airspeed control, the flight crew's inadequate monitoring of airspeed, and the flight crew's delayed execution of a go-around after they became aware that the airplane was below acceptable glidepath and airspeed tolerances. Contributing to the accident were (1) the complexities of the autothrottle and autopilot flight director systems that were inadequately described in Boeing's documentation and Asiana's pilot training, which increased the likelihood of mode error; (2) the flight crew's nonstandard communication and coordination regarding the use of the autothrottle and autopilot flight director systems; (3) the pilot flying's inadequate training on the planning and executing of visual approaches; (4) the pilot monitoring/instructor pilot's inadequate supervision of the pilot flying; and (5) flight crew fatigue, which likely degraded their performance.

=== NTSB use of social media ===
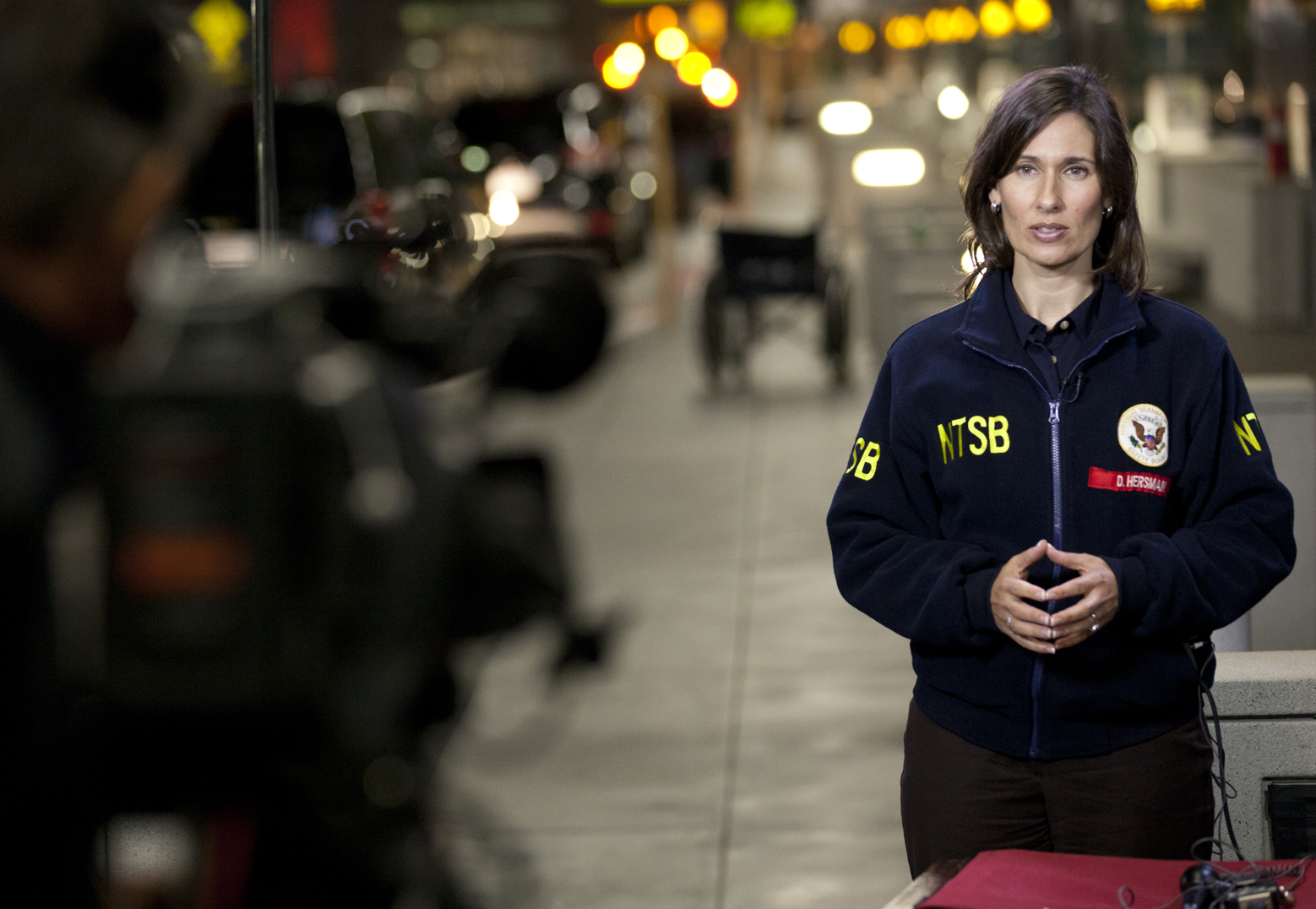
NTSB Chair Deborah Hersman answers questions on July 7

Shortly after the accident, the US National Transportation Safety Board (NTSB) used Twitter and YouTube to inform the public about the investigation and quickly publish quotes from press conferences. NTSB first tweeted about Asiana 214 less than one hour after the crash. One hour after that, the NTSB announced via Twitter that officials would hold a press conference at Reagan Airport Hangar 6 before departing for San Francisco. Less than 12 hours after the crash, the NTSB released a photo showing investigators conducting their first site assessment. On June 24, 2014, the NTSB published to YouTube a narrated accident sequence animation.

=== Air Line Pilots Association ===
On July 9, 2013, the Air Line Pilots Association (ALPA) criticized the NTSB for releasing "incomplete, out-of-context information" that gave the impression that pilot error was entirely to blame.

NTSB Chairman Hersman responded: "The information we're providing is consistent with our procedures and processes ... One of the hallmarks of the NTSB is our transparency. We work for the traveling public. There are a lot of organizations and groups that have advocates. We are the advocate for the traveling public. We believe it's important to show our work and tell people what we are doing." Answering ALPA's criticism, NTSB spokeswoman Kelly Nantel also said the agency routinely provided factual updates during investigations. "For the public to have confidence in the investigative process, transparency and accuracy are critical", Nantel said.

On July 11, 2013, in a follow-up press release without criticizing the NTSB, ALPA gave a general warning against speculation.

=== South Korean investigation ===
The South Korean government announced in a Ministry of Land, Infrastructure and Transport (MOLIT) statement that it would investigate whether the crew followed procedures and how they were trained.

== Aftermath ==
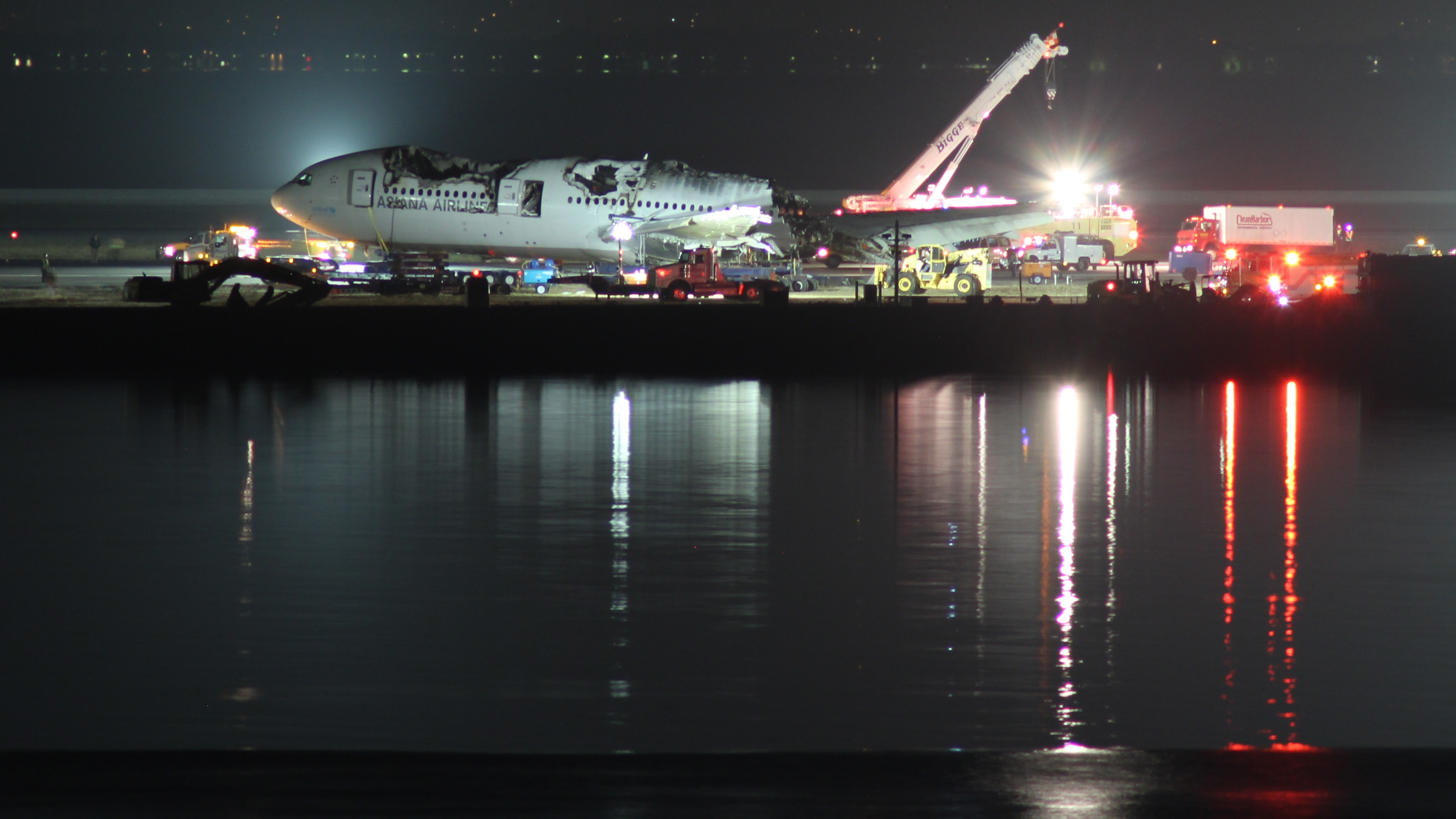
Removal of the wreckage

The airport was closed for five hours after the crash. Flights destined for San Francisco were diverted to Oakland, San Jose, Sacramento, Los Angeles, Portland, Oregon, and Seattle–Tacoma. By 3:30 p.m. PDT, runway 1L/19R and runway 1R/19L (both of which run perpendicular across the runway of the accident) were reopened; runway 10L/28R (parallel to the runway of the accident) remained closed for more than 24 hours. The accident runway, 10R/28L, reopened on July 12 after being repaired. In August 2013, Asiana renumbered its Seoul-San Francisco route with the flight OZ212, on a retimed scheduled departure of 8:40 pm, using an Airbus A350-900 aircraft; the July 6 accident OZ214 had a scheduled 4:40 pm departure using a Boeing 777-200ER.

In the U.S., drug and alcohol tests are standard after air accidents, but this is not a requirement for pilots of foreign-registered aircraft, and the pilots were not tested immediately after the accident. The lack of alcohol testing received much public attention and was critically discussed by various media and politicians after the accident. Shortly after the accident, Congresswoman Jackie Speier stated that she would consider legislation to improve airline safety by requiring increased pilot training and mandatory drug and alcohol testing for international crews.

The crash damaged Asiana's reputation and that of South Korea's aviation industry following years of apparent improvements after a series of aircraft disasters in the 1980s and early 1990s. Asiana shares fell by 5.8% on the first day of trading after the crash.

=== Response from Asiana Airlines ===
In the hours after the accident, Asiana Airlines CEO Yoon Young-doo said his airline had ruled out mechanical failure as the cause of the crash. Later, he defended the flight crew, calling them "very experienced and competent pilots". On July 9, Yoon apologized directly to the parents of the two victims, then flew aboard Flight 214 to San Francisco, the same route as the crashed aircraft, to meet with NTSB officials. Asiana gave flights to San Francisco to the families of the victims.

Asiana Airlines announced on July 29, 2013, that it would retire flight numbers 214 and 213 on August 12, 2013. Flights from Incheon to San Francisco and the return leg would thenceforth operate as OZ212 and OZ211, respectively.

Asiana Airlines officials said the airline would improve training for its pilots: in particular, for pilots learning to fly different types of aircraft, and in various skills such as making visual approaches and flying on autopilot. Asiana officials also said they would seek to improve communications skills among crew members, introduce a system to manage "fatigue risk", set up separate maintenance teams for Boeing and Airbus planes, and improve safety management systems.

On August 12, 2013, Asiana Airlines announced initial payouts to crash survivors of US$10,000, ($14,000 in 2025) stating the survivors "need money to go to hospital or for transportation so we are giving them the $10,000 first", Asiana spokeswoman Lee Hyo Min said in a telephone interview. "Even if they are not hurt or they don't go to hospital, we will still give them this money". "The carrier may pay more after the U.S. National Transportation Safety Board completes its investigation into the accident. The families of those who died were paid more than $10,000 as an initial compensation", Lee said, without providing a specific figure.

=== Response from the South Korean government ===
South Korean transport ministry officials ordered Korean Air and Asiana to check engines and landing equipment on all 48 of their model 777 aircraft and announced that the government would conduct special inspections on the nation's eight carriers through August 25, 2013. "The measures could include [changing] rules on training flights if needed", Deputy Minister for Civil Aviation Choi Jeong-ho told reporters. The officials also said South Korea had no fatal air crashes between December 1999 and the July 2011 crash of an Asiana freighter.

=== Response from the San Francisco Fire Department ===
Helmet-recorded images showed that firefighters on scene saw some victims alive outside the aircraft after being thrown from the plane. During their response, one firefighting vehicle ran over a 16-year-old girl who "was alive and lying outside the plane near one of its wings when the trucks ran over her." The firefighter driving the vehicle was reported to have said "She got run over... I mean, s— happens, you know?" (The redacted word is presumed to be "shit".) Afterward the incident was reported by the firefighter to San Francisco Fire Department chief Joanne M. Hayes-White stating "Chief, there's a woman there who's been run over by one of our rigs." The chief asked if the victim had been crushed, to which the firefighter replied "like someone dropped a pumpkin."

Chief Hayes-White initially made a public statement lauding her firefighters for having "worked as best as it possibly could have". After two days, Hayes-White addressed the incident and said that "public officials most certainly have a duty to tell the truth", and that "it would have been speculative and irresponsible to report something without having confirmation" during the first two days while the San Francisco police and National Transportation Safety Board conducted their investigation. The San Mateo County prosecutors did not file criminal charges against San Francisco firefighters for what they described as a "tragic accident".

Hayes-White stated that the department's 2009 ban on video recording devices would be extended to include any devices mounted on helmets that record emergencies citing privacy concerns.

==== Lawsuits involving Fire Department response ====
On December 30, 2013, the "parents and successors" of the girl killed after being run over by a responding fire department vehicle filed a lawsuit against the San Francisco Fire Department, and its chief at the time. The lawsuit was later dropped as part of a "confidential settlement", however "the city attorney's office said no money was paid to the family to dismiss their lawsuit."

On May 9, 2014, the San Francisco Fire Department firefighter who drove the vehicle that ran over the girl in the above incident filed a lawsuit against the City and County of San Francisco alleging they were treated as a scapegoat by fire department command staff "to minimize and downplay broader failures within the SFFD [response]" by pushing responsibility for the incident onto the individual. The lawsuit was later settled for $250,000. The firefighter was never criminally charged.

=== Lawsuits ===
On July 15, 2013, two Korean passengers filed a lawsuit against Asiana Airlines in a California federal court for "an extensive litany of errors and omissions" and improper crew training and supervision. On the same day, 83 passengers filed a petition for discovery in Chicago, alleging a possible failure of the autothrottle system and malfunctioning evacuation slides and seat belts. An additional lawsuit against Asiana Airlines and Boeing Aircraft Company was filed on August 9, 2013. In addition to alleging product defects, the suits focus on the training provided to the Asiana crew.

Seventy-two passengers reached an undisclosed settlement that was filed in United States Federal court on March 3, 2015. On the same day the Los Angeles Times reported that, "At least 60 lawsuits against the airline filed in the Northern District of California ... have not reached settlements", and "dozens of claims have been filed against the airline in China and South Korea and against Boeing in an Illinois state court."

Asiana also initially announced it would file a defamation lawsuit against KTVU for having aired the Asiana Airlines KTVU prank, but withdrew from that course of action two days later.

=== Legislative action ===
On July 30, 2013, an amendment to Transportation bill H.R. 2610 was adopted by voice vote for the transfer of $500,000 from the Next Generation Air Transportation System account to the air safety account to study implementing a verbal warning system for low air speed.

=== Fines ===
On February 25, 2014, the U.S. Department of Transportation fined Asiana Airlines US$500,000 for failing to keep victims and family of victims updated on the crash.

== In popular culture ==
=== Mayday TV series ===
Mayday: Air Crash Investigation mentioned Asiana Airlines Flight 214 in its Season 13 episode, "Getting Out Alive", as part of a series of accidents and discussion of how passengers were able to escape. A season 15 episode focused solely on the Flight 214 accident, titled "Terror in San Francisco", aired on January 13, 2016.

=== KTVU prank ===
San Francisco television station KTVU “fell victim” to a prank which led news anchor Tori Campbell to report the names of the pilots as "Captain Sum Ting Wong," "Wi Tu Lo," "Ho Lee Fuk," and "Bang Ding Ow," (Note: the prank names sounded like in order, 'Captain, something wrong', 'we too low', 'holy fuck', and 'bang ding ow' presumably being Onomatopoeia) in the immediate aftermath of the crash. Viewers quickly realized that these "names" were phonetic double entendres. The NTSB described the names as "inaccurate and offensive". This led to the firing of three veteran KTVU producers. While the source of these joke names remains unclear, the NTSB admitted in a statement that one of its summer interns had confirmed the erroneous names when they were stated by the news station. The intern was later dismissed.

== See also ==
- List of accidents and incidents involving commercial aircraft
- British Airways Flight 38
- Turkish Airlines Flight 1951
- Lion Air Flight 904
- Delta Air Lines Flight 723
- Emirates Flight 521
- Sosoliso Airlines Flight 1145
- Korean Air Flight 801
- AIRES Flight 8250
- Asiana Airlines Flight 733
- Asiana Airlines Flight 162
- 1961 Ndola United Nations DC-6 crash
- Air Canada Flight 624
- UPS Airlines Flight 1354
