= WVCS =

WVCS may refer to:

- WVCS (FM), a radio station (90.1 FM) licensed to serve Owen, Wisconsin, United States
- WCAL, a radio station (91.9 FM) licensed to serve California, Pennsylvania, United States, which held the call sign WVCS from 1971 to 2005
- West Valley Christian School
