= No Man's Land (2021 American film) =

2021 film

- Film poster
- Directed by: Conor Allyn
- Written by: Jake Allyn; David Barraza
- Produced by: Conor Allyn; Jake Allyn; Rob Allyn; Joel Shapiro
- Starring: Frank Grillo; Jake Allyn; George Lopez; Andie MacDowell; Alex MacNicoll; Jorge A. Jiménez; Andres Delgado
- Cinematography: Juan Pablo Ramírez
- Edited by: Curtiss Clayton
- Music by: Brooke Blair; Will Blair
- Production companies: Bluegrass Pictures; Margate House Films
- Distributed by: IFC Films
- Release date: January 22, 2021
- Running time: 114 minutes
- Country: United States
- Languages: English; Spanish
- Box office: $176,672

No Man's Land is a 2021 American Western film, directed by Conor Allyn from a screenplay by Jake Allyn and David Barraza. It stars Frank Grillo, Jake Allyn, George Lopez, Andie MacDowell, Alex MacNicoll, Jorge A. Jiménez, and Andres Delgado.

== Plot ==
Bill Greer is a Texas rancher living with his two sons, Jackson and Lucas, and his wife, Monica, in a ranch close to the Rio Grande where illegal immigrants from Mexico cross the U.S. Mexican Border. Jackson was prepared to move to New York City so he could join the New York Yankees. Illegal immigrants would trespass into the ranch, cutting the fences and freeing the horses and cows. Due to their frequent trespasses, the Greer family is about to lose their ranch despite Jackson's assistance in staying even though he wanted to go to college in New York

Meanwhile, an illegal Mexican father, Gustavo, a former smuggler, takes his son, Fernando, and his mother to the border and meets Luis, the leader of the smuggling ring transporting illegal immigrants into the country. One night, Bill and Lucas will be on patrol of the ranch until morning, but Gustavo and his family end up on the ranch, where Bill and Lucas confront them at gunpoint just before Jackson comes by to help. A coyote brandished a knife, leading to a scuffle between Bill and Gustavo, trying to defend his son, but when Fernando tries to help his father, Jackson shoots and kills Fernando out of fear for his dad's life. Lucas is shot during the struggle, and Bill forces Gustavo and the rest of the immigrants off his property just before the police arrive.

Texas Ranger Ramirez questions Bill and, not wanting to let his son be arrested for shooting an unarmed illegal immigrant, fabricated the story of him shooting the unarmed Fernando. Jackson, feeling guilty and frustrated that he could get arrested, is confronted by Ramirez and is forced to ride his horse across the river and into the Mexican border after being chased by Ramirez. The ranger comes back to inform Bill and Monica to try and convince them to call Jackson to come back to the States. Meanwhile, Jackson rides his horse to a smuggling camp, where he meets Luis, who tries to rob him of his horse before escaping.

Gustavo meets Luis after visiting the morgue, and Luis gives him a gun so that Gustavo can find and kill Jackson. As Jackson journeys in the desert, he is picked up by cattle ranchers Hector and his daughter, Maria, and takes him and his horse back to his ranch. While working at Hector's ranch, Jackson bonds with Maria and the other ranchers. During a visit to a bar, Luis finds Jackson at the bar, but he leaves after other attendees threaten him and his gang to leave.

The next morning, Jackson calls his father, who tells him that the Texas Rangers will come to extradite him to the States with the Mexican Police, but he hangs up. Jackson leaves his horse under Maria's care before taking a bus to Guanajuato. However, Luis follows Jackson on to the bus after he and Gustavo stop the vehicle. Luis is distracted by one of the passengers recording the scene on a phone, allowing Jackson to escape into the forest. Gustavo breaks off with Luis after discovering Jackson is heading to his hometown.

Jackson stumbles on a cabin owned by an elderly couple before being captured by the Mexican police. They hand him over to Ramirez, who has come to extradite him. Jackson manages to escape Ramirez before he spots Gustavo attending his son's funeral and heads to the church where the funeral is happening. Jackson expresses remorse to Gustavo for killing his son and Gustavo forgives him. Luis appears and has Jackson at gunpoint, but Ramirez arrives and shoots Luis, killing him. Jackson returns to Texas to see his family, before Ramirez takes him in to serve two years in prison.

== Cast ==
- Frank Grillo as Bill Greer
- Jake Allyn as Jackson Greer
- George Lopez as Ramirez
- Andie MacDowell as Monica Greer
- Esmeralda Pimentel as Victoria
- Alex MacNicoll as Lucas Greer
- Jorge A. Jiménez as Gustavo
- Andres Delgado as Luis
- Ofelia Medina as Lupe
- Tiaré Scanda as Maria

== Production ==
In June 2019, Jake Allyn, Frank Grillo, Jorge A. Jiménez, George Lopez, Andie MacDowell, and Alex MacNicoll joined the cast of the film, with Allyn directing from a screenplay by Jake Allyn and David Barraza Ibañez.

Principal photography began in June 2019.

== Release ==
In June 2020, IFC Films acquired distribution rights to the film. The film was released on January 22, 2021.

== Reception ==
Review aggregator Rotten Tomatoes gives the film a 40% approval rating based on 48 reviews, with an average rating of 5.60/10. The website's consensus reads: "Noble yet often monotonous, No Man's Land proves that the old adage about a road paved with good intentions is just as true for a dusty Western trail." According to Metacritic, which sampled 14 critics and calculated a score of 52 out of 100, the film received "mixed or average reviews".
