= Merah Putih =

Merah Putih is an Indonesian term for "red (and) white", it may refer to:

- Flag of Indonesia, known in native Indonesian as Sang Saka Merah-Putih, Bendera Merah-Putih or Merah-Putih
- Merah Putih Bridge, a bridge that spans over Ambon Bay in Ambon City, Maluku, Indonesia
- Merah Putih (film), a 2009 war film depicting the Indonesian struggle for independence
- Merah Putih: One for All, a 2025 animated film commemorating Indonesia's 80th Independence Day
- Merah Putih (satellite), an Indonesian satellite
- Red and White Cabinet, cabinet of Indonesia (2024–present)

== See also ==
- Red and White (disambiguation)
