= Scott Reeves =

American actor, musician, and songwriter (born 1966)

- Born: Gregory Scott Reeves; May 16, 1966 (age 60); Santa Monica, California, U.S.
- Occupations: Actor; musician; songwriter
- Years active: 1988–present
- Spouse: Melissa Reeves (m. 1990)
- Children: 2

Gregory Scott Reeves (born May 16, 1966) is an American actor, musician, and songwriter. He is known for playing the roles of Ryan McNeil on the CBS Daytime soap opera The Young and the Restless (1991 to 2001), Steven Webber on the ABC Daytime soap opera General Hospital (2009 to 2013, 2024), and Noel Laughlin on the ABC series Nashville (2014 to 2016). For his work on The Young and the Restless, Reeves was nominated for two Daytime Emmy Awards for Outstanding Supporting Actor in a Drama Series. He has received two Soap Opera Digest Award nominations and won the award for Outstanding Younger Leading Actor in 1994.

As a musician, Reeves co-founded the country music duo Blue County with Aaron Benward. Their self-titled debut album was released on Curb Records in 2006. They had four songs reach the Billboard charts. Reeves also co-wrote the song "Made in America", which was recorded by Toby Keith and charted at number one.

== Early life ==
Reeves was born in Santa Monica, California and raised in the San Fernando Valley. His father was a Beverly Hills police officer and his mother owned a publishing company. He attended West Valley Christian School, where he played baseball and football. After graduation, he studied acting at the Renee Harmon Commercial Workshop and the Beverly Hills Playhouse. He also worked with acting coach Carole D'Andrea.

== Career ==
In 1988, Reeves was cast in a short-term role as Jake Hogansen on the NBC Daytime soap opera Days of Our Lives. He also had a recurring role as Dustin Nelson on the syndicated comedy series The Munsters Today. Reeves played an Emcee in the comedy film Big Man on Campus (1989). He also played Sean Robertson in the horror film Friday the 13th Part VIII: Jason Takes Manhattan (1989). Reeves played Bruce in the television miniseries I Know My First Name is Steven. He guest starred on Teen Angel Returns.

He appeared in television commercials for Diet Coke and McDonald's. He played Luke in the action film Edge of Honor (1991), co-starring with Corey Feldman. In 1991, Reeves was cast as Ryan McNeil on the CBS Daytime soap opera The Young and the Restless. The role was intended to be recurring, but he was soon offered a contract. In 1993, he was nominated for a Soap Opera Digest Award for Outstanding Younger Leading Actor for his work on The Young and the Restless. He was nominated again in the same category in 1994 and won the award.

Reeves played Kyle Raines in the television film Hearts Adrift (1996), co-starring with Sydney Penny. He played Brian McDermott in the television film When the Cradle Falls (1997), co-starring with Martha Byrne. In 1997, Reeves was nominated for a Daytime Emmy Award for Outstanding Supporting Actor in a Drama Series for his work on The Young and the Restless. He was nominated again in the same category in 1998.

Reeves guest starred on Chicago Hope in 1998. He co-starred with his wife, Melissa Reeves, in the television film Half a Dozen Babies (1999). The movie was based on the true story of the Dilley sextuplets, with the Reeves playing their parents. In 1999, he received a Soap Opera Digest Award nomination for Best Supporting Actor for his work on The Young and the Restless.

In 2001, he guest starred on The King of Queens and Touched by an Angel. He played Alan in the short film Basic Training. In August 2001, it was announced that Reeves had been dismissed from his role on The Young and the Restless. His final airdate was November 27, 2001. The character of Ryan died when he jumped in front of a bullet to save Victoria Newman. Reeves played Gilbert Ray Johnson in the film Waitin' to Live (2003).

In 2003, Reeves and Aaron Benward formed the country music duo Blue County. They toured with singers Tim McGraw, Kenny Chesney, and Keith Urban. In 2005, they were nominated for Top Vocal Duo at the Academy of Country Music Awards. They released their self-titled debut album on Curb Records in 2006. Blue County released four singles that made it to the Billboard charts, "Good Little Girls" "That's Cool", "Nothing but Cowboy Boots" and "That Summer Song." They also released three music videos.

Reeves returned to acting, appearing in the Hallmark Channel television film Final Approach (2007). He joined the cast of the ABC Daytime soap opera General Hospital, playing Steven Webber. His first airdate was December 9, 2009. The role was initially recurring, but Reeves was put on contract in February 2010. The part had previously been played by Shaun Benson in 2005.

Reeves co-wrote Toby Keith's 2011 number one single, "Made in America". He also formed a band, Port Chuck, along with General Hospital co-stars Steve Burton, Bradford Anderson, and Brandon Barash. In 2012, Reeves guest starred on GCB. In December 2012, Reeves announced that he had been dismissed from his role on General Hospital. His final airdate was March 5, 2013. The character of Steve was sent to prison for murdering a patient.

From 2014 to 2016, Reeves played the recurring role of Noel Laughlin on the ABC series Nashville. In 2015, he appeared in the Disney Channel television film Invisible Sister. He guest starred on Finding Carter. He co-starred with his wife, Melissa Reeves, in the film Where the Fast Lane Ends (2017). He played a country singer in the Hallmark Channel television film Christmas at Graceland (2018), co-starring with Kellie Pickler.

In 2019, Reeves guest starred on The Resident. He also appeared on the Netflix series Dolly Parton's Heartstrings. In 2022, he was cast in the film Someone Like You. In 2024, he appeared in the film Ride, co-starring with C. Thomas Howell. His first cousins, Matt and Cole, have a band called The Reeves Brothers, that he has managed since 2022.

In October 2024, it was announced that Reeves would be returning to General Hospital as Steven Webber for several episodes.

== Personal life ==
He met actress Melissa Reeves (then known as Melissa Brennan) when he played the role of Jake on Days of Our Lives. They became engaged on April 1, 1989, in Vancouver, where he was filming Friday the 13th Part VIII: Jason Takes Manhattan. He proposed to her at Stanley Park.

After experiencing seizures in 1989, he sought medical help. He was diagnosed with an abscess on his brain, caused by sinusitis that had traveled to his forehead. Shortly before his wedding, he underwent surgery to have the abscess removed. The Reeves were married on March 23, 1990, at Lake Manor Chapel in Chatsworth, California. They are Christians. They have a daughter, born in 1992, and a son, born in 1997.

In late February 2017, Reeves had to postpone concert dates with his band, Port Chuck, when he was suddenly hospitalized. He was initially thought to have a heart condition, but after a brief hospital stay, he announced that he was fine.

== Filmography ==
=== Film ===
Year	Title	Role	Notes
1989	Big Man on Campus	Emcee	
1989	Friday the 13th Part VIII: Jason Takes Manhattan	Sean Robertson	
1991	Edge of Honor	Luke	
2001	Basic Training	Alan	Short film
2003	Waitin' to Live	Gilbert Ray Johnson	
2015	Hold/Fast	John Daylong	Short film
2015	The Longest Ride	Luke Collins	
2017	Where the Fast Lane Ends	Jack Morgan	
2019	Palau the Movie	Ray Stedman	
2021	The Man from Nowhere	James	
2021	Boys	Homeless Man	Short film
2022	Sons 2 the Grave	Ed Wheeler	
2024	Someone Like You	Larry Quinn	
2024	Ride	Ross Dickons	
2025	Regretting You	Chris Grant	

=== Television ===
Year	Title	Role	Notes
1988	Days of Our Lives	Jake Hogansen	Recurring role
1988–1989	The Munsters Today	Dustin Nelson	Episodes: "Vampire Pie", "Two Left Feet", "Neighborly Munsters"
1989	I Know My First Name Is Steven	Bruce	Television miniseries 2 episodes
1990	Teen Angel Returns	Brian	Unknown episode
1991–2001	The Young and the Restless	Ryan McNeil	Contract role: June 26, 1991 to November 27, 2001; Guest appearance on December 5, 2001
1996	Hearts Adrift	Kyle Raines	Television film
1997	When the Cradle Falls	Brian McDermott	Television film
1998	Chicago Hope	Todd Landers	Episode: "The Other Cheek"
1999	Half a Dozen Babies	Keith Dilley	Television film
2001	The King of Queens	Ryan McNeil	Episode: "Inner Tube"
2001	Touched by an Angel	Peter	Episode: "Manhunt"
2005	As the World Turns	Himself	Episode dated February 15, 2005
2007	Final Approach	Dan Reynolds	Television film
2009–2013, 2024	General Hospital	Steven Webber	Contract role: December 9, 2009 – March 5, 2013, Recurring role: 2024
2012	GCB	Captain McPhee	Episode: "Turn the Other Cheek"
2014–2016	Nashville	Noel Laughlin	Recurring role (seasons 3–4), 14 episodes
2015	Invisible Sister	Cleo's father	Television film
2015	Finding Carter	Bill	Episode: "The Death of the Heart"
2018	Kingpin	John Connolly	Episode: "Whitey Bulger"
2018	Christmas at Graceland	Country Star (Scott Reeves)	Television film
2019	The Resident	Vince McGill	Episode: "Nurses' Day"
2019	Dolly Parton's Heartstrings	Hugh	Episode: "Jolene"

== Awards and nominations ==
Year	Award	Category	Title	Result	Ref.
1993	Soap Opera Digest Award	Outstanding Younger Leading Actor	The Young and the Restless	Nominated	
1994	Soap Opera Digest Award	Outstanding Younger Leading Actor	The Young and the Restless	Won	
1997	Daytime Emmy Award	Outstanding Supporting Actor in a Drama Series	The Young and the Restless	Nominated	
1998	Daytime Emmy Award	Outstanding Supporting Actor in a Drama Series	The Young and the Restless	Nominated	
1999	Soap Opera Digest Award	Best Supporting Actor	The Young and the Restless	Nominated	
