= Java Heat =

- U.S. movie poster
- Directed by: Conor Allyn
- Written by: Rob Allyn
- Produced by: Conor Allyn; Rob Allyn; Seth Baron
- Starring: Kellan Lutz; Mickey Rourke; Ario Bayu; Atiqah Hasiholan; Rudy Wowor
- Cinematography: Shane Daly
- Edited by: Harvey Rosenstock
- Music by: Justin Caine Burnett
- Distributed by: IFC Films; IM Global
- Release dates: April 18, 2013 (Indonesia); May 10, 2013 (United States)
- Running time: 103 minutes
- Countries: United States; Indonesia
- Languages: English; Indonesian
- Budget: $15 million
- Box office: $189,739

Java Heat is a 2013 action film. Directed by Conor Allyn, the film stars Kellan Lutz, Mickey Rourke, Ario Bayu and Atiqah Hasiholan.

== Plot ==
A suicide bomber detonates himself at a party in Java, Indonesia, and a Javanese Sultan's daughter, Sultana (Atiqah Hasiholan), is believed to be one of the unidentified victims. Jake Travers (Kellan Lutz), an American posing as a graduate student from Cornell University, was at the scene of the blast and is held as a witness by a police detective of Detachment 88, Lieutenant Hashim (Ario Bayu).

After interviewing Jake at the crime scene, Hashim and Jake are attacked by terrorists led by Malik (Mickey Rourke) and his henchman Achmed. Jake saves Hashim and kills two terrorists, but Achmed manages to escape. Hashim becomes suspicious after he observes Jake's combat skills. Jake and Hashim are brought to the hospital, where Hashim's wife meets Jake. At Hashim's wife's insistence, Hashim invites Jake to their house for breakfast. At the house, Hashim tells Jake he ran a background check on him through Interpol. Jake tells Hashim he is an FBI agent conducting an undercover investigation, suggesting they cooperate together.

Returning to his apartment, Jake faxes to a friend stateside a photo of a tattoo from the corpse believed to be Sultana's. Jake's friend informs him that the tattoo is typically used by Chinese high-class prostitutes, which confirms Jake's suspicion that the body is not Sultana's.

Jake follows a lead to a nightclub, where he brings home a prostitute bearing a similar tattoo. When the prostitute cooperates with Jake, they are ambushed by Hashim's terrorists and a Chinese gang operating the prostitution ring. The police, who had been covertly surveilling Jake, intervene and suffer casualties in the fight. Jake flees the scene, but the police eventually capture him.

Hashim arrives home and discovers his family has been kidnapped. Malik calls Hashim on a cell phone left at the house and taunts him. Hashim visits the police station, observing two U.S. Marine officers talking to his superior. Hashim confronts Jake again about his identity. Jake admits he is not an FBI agent, but a Marine who is tracking terrorist activities because his comrades were killed by bombs from Malik's terrorist group. Jake then suggests that Hashim cooperate with him to find his family. Jake later confesses to Hashim that the terrorists also killed his brother.

Suspecting that Sultana was kidnapped rather than killed, Jake and Hashim meet the Sultan, who oddly avoids discussing the matter in front of his vizier. The Sultan then slips Hashim a secret message requesting a private meeting. Later, the Sultan meets Hashim and confides in him that Sultana was kidnapped and his throne is the ransom. The Sultan suspects his vizier is behind the plot. The vizier, however, learns about the meeting and a shoot-out ensues. Hashim and Jake manage to escape, but the Sultan is fatally wounded.

Hashim and Jake intercept the vizier and his men at a bank as they are carting off the Sultan's royal jewelry. Hashim and Jake hide in a spa when Malik calls Hashim and threatens them. Hashim discovers Malik had intercepted his phone to reveal their location. Malik, who is outside, attacks Hashim and Jake with an RPG. In the ensuing chaos, Jake manages to save a royal jewel. As it turns out, Hashim's family is held captive in a van, and Malik and Achmed argue whether or not to set them free. In rage, Malik stabs Achmed. Disguised as paramedics, Jake and Hashim flee the site in an ambulance with a wounded Achmed inside. Before he dies, Achmed reveals where Hashim's family is being held captive.

Jake and Hashim chase Malik through a Vesak ceremony at Borobudur temple. They rescue Sultana and Hashim's family from Malik and subsequently kill him. Jake secretly switches the jewel Malik holds with the one in his possession.

Jake is at the airport, where he returns the jewelry to Sultana, as Hashim watches. Jake then boards the plane to face a Court Martial in the U.S. to face Charges of possibly desertion from the Marine Duty and Murder of Malik.

== Cast ==
- Kellan Lutz as Jake Traver
- Mickey Rourke as Malik
- Ario Bayu as Hashim
- Atiqah Hasiholan as Sultana
- Uli Auliani as Rani
- Nick McKinless as Bretton
- Mike Muliadro as Achmed
- Mike Duncan as Captain Baron
- Rio Dewanto as Anton
- Brent Duke as Marine Sergeant

== Production ==
On October 28, The Jakarta Post revealed that Mickey Rourke, Tio Pakusadewo, Atiqah Hasiholan, and Frans Tumbuan had all been selected to appear in the film. The film was mainly filmed in Yogyakarta and Central Java, Indonesia. Scenes were filmed at notable landmarks, such as Borobudur and Sewu temple, Taman Sari underground corridors, Tugu monument and the Yogyakarta Sultan's Palace.

The film was screened at the Dallas International Film Festival on April 4, 2013, then at the Taormina Film Fest on June 15–22.

== Reception ==
=== Box office ===
Java Heat has grossed $1,061 in the United States and Canada, and $188,678 in other territories, for a worldwide total of $189,739, against a production budget of $15 million.

=== Critical response ===
On review aggregator website Rotten Tomatoes, the film holds an approval rating of 7% based on 14 reviews, and an average rating of 3.3/10. On Metacritic, the film has a weighted average score of 35 out of 100, based on 8 critics, indicating "generally unfavorable" reviews.

Resty Woro Yuniar of Wall Street Journal: Southeast Asia gave the film three and a half stars out of 5, writing "while the plot is predictable, the movie does give a viewer a good feel [of Indonesia]" and notes "the movie does a fairly good job of capturing Indonesian traditions."

Jeff Bounds from Dallas Business Journal noted that the "lighting, the special effects, and the cinematography" looked like it came straight out of Hollywood rather than Indonesia.
