= Dirty Hands (disambiguation) =

Dirty Hands is a 1948 play by Jean-Paul Sartre

Dirty Hands or Dirty hands may also refer to:

- Problem of dirty hands, a concept in moral and political philosophy
- Dirty hands doctrine, an equitable defense in contract law
- Dirty Hands (1951 film), a French film directed by Fernand Rivers and Simone Berriau
- Dirty Hands (2008 drama film), an American political film
- Dirty Hands: The Art and Crimes of David Choe, a 2008 American documentary film
- Dirty Hands (2026 film), an American action crime thriller film
- "Dirty Hands" (Battlestar Galactica), an episode of Battlestar Galactica
- Les innocents aux mains sales or Dirty Hands, a 1975 West German film
- "Dirty Hands", a song by Black Lips

== See also ==
- Clean hands (disambiguation)
- Dirty Hand, a silent film starring Ben Alexander
