= Lionel Sinathrya =

Indonesian footballer (born 2007)

Personal information
- Full name: Lionel Nathan Sinathrya Kartoprawiro
- Date of birth: 28 June 2007 (age 19)
- Place of birth: Jakarta, Indonesia
- Position: Central defender

Team information
- Current team: ICEF

Youth career
- Years: Team
- 2020–2021: FIFA Farmel
- 2021–: ICEF

Lionel Nathan Sinathrya Kartoprawiro (born 28 June 2007) is an Indonesian footballer who plays as a central defender at the International Center of European Football.

== Early life ==
Lionel was born in the Mitra Keluarga Jatinegara Hospital in Bali Mester, Jatinegara in Jakarta, to Darius Sinathrya and Donna Agnesia, both of whom have worked as models, actors and presenters. He has a younger brother named Diego and a younger sister named Sabrina.

As a child, he received personal football training.

== Education ==
He previously entered St. Ursula School Bumi Serpong Damai before moving to France in 2021.

== Club career ==
Lionel began his career with an academy in Indonesia called FIFA Farmel, where he played between 2020 and 2021. In September 2021, Sinathrya moved on his own to Paris, France, to enrol at the International Center of European Football (ICEF), a boarding school for budding footballers, which then partnered and changed its name to the Paris Saint-Germain Academy Pro.

== International career ==
At the end of July 2023, Sinathrya attended a training camp for the Indonesian under-17 national team. Following the conclusion of the camp, under-17 manager Bima Sakti praised his posture and vision. Sinathrya himself was quoted as saying "I really want to enter the TC (training center), get into the national team squad for the U-17 World Cup and defend the country". Sinathrya started his journey by participating in the selection for the U-17 Indonesian National Team in Surabaya. He passed the initial selection, after competing with many players from East Java and other regions. So, after passing the regional selection, He was included in the list of 50 players who were again screened by Bima Sakti to enter the U-17 Indonesian National Team, but failed to qualify for the next stage.
