= Clean Hands (2026 film) =

- Theatrical release poster
- Directed by: Jake Allyn
- Written by: Jake Allyn
- Produced by: Brian Loschiavo; James Suttles; Jason Winn; JR Rappaport; Conor Allyn; Jake Allyn
- Starring: Zach Braff; Esther McGregor; Holt McCallany; Abigail Spencer; Lucas Till
- Cinematography: Keith Leman
- Edited by: Owen Jackson
- Music by: Those Who Ride With Giants
- Production companies: Margate House Films; WW SF Entertainment; Riverside Entertainment; Glasshouse Pictures
- Distributed by: Vertical
- Release dates: June 7, 2026 (Tribeca Festival); September 17, 2026 (Maryland Theatre); October 16, 2026 (United States)
- Running time: 108 minutes
- Country: United States
- Language: English

Clean Hands is a 2026 American biographical crime drama film written, produced, and directed by Jake Allyn. It stars Zach Braff, Esther McGregor, Holt McCallany, Abigail Spencer, and Lucas Till.

The film premiered at the Tribeca Festival on June 7, 2026. On September 17, 2026, the main premiere was held at the Maryland Theatre in Hagerstown, Maryland, the city in which the film is set. The film was released in the United States on October 16, 2026.

== Premise ==
The inspirational true story of hero drug cop turned recovery advocate Kevin Simmers and his daughter Brooke. The film, which takes place in Hagerstown, MD, examines the American drug crisis from the opposing eyes of cop and addict who were also father and daughter.

== Cast ==
- Zach Braff as Kevin Simmers
- Esther McGregor as Brooke Simmers
- Holt McCallany as David Trone
- Abigail Spencer as Dana
- Lucas Till as Deputy Dormer

== Production ==
In March 2025, it was reported that Jake Allyn would be writing, producing, and directing a biographical crime drama film titled Clean Hands. Zach Braff and Esther McGregor were cast in the lead roles.

== Release ==
Clean Hands premiered at the Tribeca Festival on June 7, 2026. In June 2026, Vertical acquired the distribution rights. The film had a premiere screening in Hagerstown, MD at the Maryland Theatre on September 17, 2026, and it was released in the United States on October 16, 2026.

== Reception ==
On the review aggregator website Rotten Tomatoes, 40% of 10 critics' reviews are positive.
