= Rudy Wowor =

Indonesian actor, dancer, television presenter (1941–2018)

- Born: Rudolf Canesius Soemolang Wowor; 13 December 1941; Amsterdam, Netherlands
- Died: 5 October 2018 (aged 76); Depok, Indonesia
- Occupations: Actor; dancer; television presenter
- Spouses: Renny Soerjanti Hoegeng (m. 1975; div. 2003); Endang Suprihatin
- Children: 3

Rudolf Canesius Soemolang Wowor (13 December 1941 – 5 October 2018), better known as Rudy Wowor was a Dutch Indonesian dancer and actor of Indonesian cinema, often playing the role of Dutch antagonist. Wowor was of Indo descent and a citizen of Netherlands and Indonesia.

== Biography ==
Son of a Dutch mother and a Manadonese father, he started his film career in the 1970s. Famous films he starred in include Virgin Dreams (1976), Aladdin (1980), Tjoet Nja' Dhien (1988), Soerabaia '45 (1990), Merah Putih (2009 film), and Java Heat (2013). He was nominated for Best Supporting Actor 1988 FFI for the film Tjoet Nja' Dhien.

== Career ==
Aside from acting, Wowor was also a dancer and choreographer. In 2007, Wowor became the permanent judge for the dance reality show titled Dance Celebrity Quiz.

Wowor had also written for Elle magazine and other periodicals. Having mastered seven languages, he also wrote in Spanish and Australian newspapers. Wowor died on 5 October 2018 from prostate cancer, aged 76.

== Awards and nominations ==
Year	Award	Category	Recipients	Result
1988	Indonesian Film Festival	Citra Award for Best Supporting Actor	Tjoet Nja' Dhien	Nominated
