= Yadi Sugandi =

- Born: September 15, 1958 (age 68); Indonesia
- Education: Institut Kesenian Jakarta (non-degree)
- Occupations: Cinematographer; film director; photographer
- Years active: 1980–present
- Known for: Cinematography and film direction
- Awards: Citra Award for Best Cinematography (2011)

Yadi Sugandi (born 15 September 1958) is an Indonesian cinematographer, photographer, and film director. Sugandi is recognized as one of Indonesia's prominent cinematographers, having received multiple nominations for the Citra Award for Best Cinematography, which he won in 2011 for the film ? (Question Mark).

== Early life and education ==
Sugandi was born on 15 September 1958 in Indonesia. He attended the Institut Kesenian Jakarta but left during his second semester. He began his career in the media industry in 1980, initially working as a wedding photographer before transitioning to film cinematography.

== Career ==
Sugandi made his feature film cinematography debut with the 1998 drama Kuldesak. Over the years, he has served as the Director of Photography for several notable Indonesian films, including Petualangan Sherina (1999), Pasir Berbisik (2000), Laskar Pelangi (2008), Sang Penari (2011), and Athirah (2016).

In 2009, Sugandi made his directorial debut with the historical war film Merah Putih. He went on to direct its sequels, Darah Garuda (2010) and Hati Merdeka (2011).

== Selected filmography ==
- Kuldesak (1998)
- Petualangan Sherina (1999)
- Pasir Berbisik (2000)
- 3 Hari untuk Selamanya (2007)
- Laskar Pelangi (2008)
- Minggu Pagi di Victoria Park (2010)
- ? (2011 film)
- Sang Penari (2011)
- Di Balik 98 (2015)
- Ada Apa dengan Cinta? 2 (2016)
- Athirah (2016)
- Nanti Kita Cerita tentang Hari Ini (2020)
- Petualangan Sherina 2 (2023)
