= Jake Allyn =

American actor and filmmaker

- Allyn in 2026
- Born: June 20, 1990 (age 36); California, U.S.
- Occupations: Actor, filmmaker
- Parent: Rob Allyn
- Relatives: Conor Allyn (brother)

Jake Allyn is an American actor and filmmaker. He made his feature directorial debut with Ride (2024), which he also starred. He also co-wrote and starred in the film No Man's Land (2021). On television, he is known for playing BoJohn Folsom in The Quad. He also starred in the film Someone Like You (2024).

== Personal life ==
Allyn was born in Dallas. He is the son of Rob Allyn and the brother of Conor Allyn.

== Filmography ==
=== Film ===
Year	Title	Role	Notes
2013	His Father's Son	Paul Hebert	Short film
2013	Masquerade	Albert	Short film
2014	Zoe Gone	Taylor	
2015	Appetites	Michael	
2016	Pocket Listing	Anderson	
2016	Drone Wars	Machine Gunner	
2017	Calico Queens	Bucky	Short film
2020	Run Sweetheart Run	Donny	
2021	No Man's Land	Jackson	
2021	Sweet Girl	Titus	
2024	Someone Like You	Dawson Gage	
2024	Ride	Peter	
2024	Venom: The Last Dance	Las Vegas Security Guard	

=== Television ===
Year	Title	Role	Notes
2014	Killer Kids	Tommy Strelka	Episode: "Two Strikes & Hail Mary"
2014	Sex Sent Me to the ER	Arnie/Sebastian	2 episodes
2016	The Middle	Jason	Episode: "The Man Hunt"
2018	Overexposed	Jimmy Cowls	TV movie
2018	NCIS	Navy Petty Officer Second Class James Sweeney	Episode: "Handle with Care"
2017–2018	The Quad	BoJohn Folsom	19 episode
2019	Hidden in Plain Sight	Lucas	TV movie
2019	Mayans M.C.	Syph	Episode: "Muluc"
2024	The Baxters	Ryan Taylor	34 episodes
2024	NCIS: Hawaiʻi	New Jesse	2 episodes
2025	S.W.A.T.	Jace Graham	2 episodes
2025	The Last of Us	Morello	Episode: "Day One"

=== As director ===
- Ride (2024)
- Clean Hands (2026)

=== As screenwriter ===
- Forsaken (2017)
- ExPatriot (2017)
- No Man's Land (2021)
- Ride (2024)

=== As producer ===
- No Man's Land (2021)
- Edge of the World (2021; as executive producer)
- The Resurrection of Charles Manson (2023)
- Ride (2024)
