= Darius Sinathrya =

Swiss-born Indonesian actor

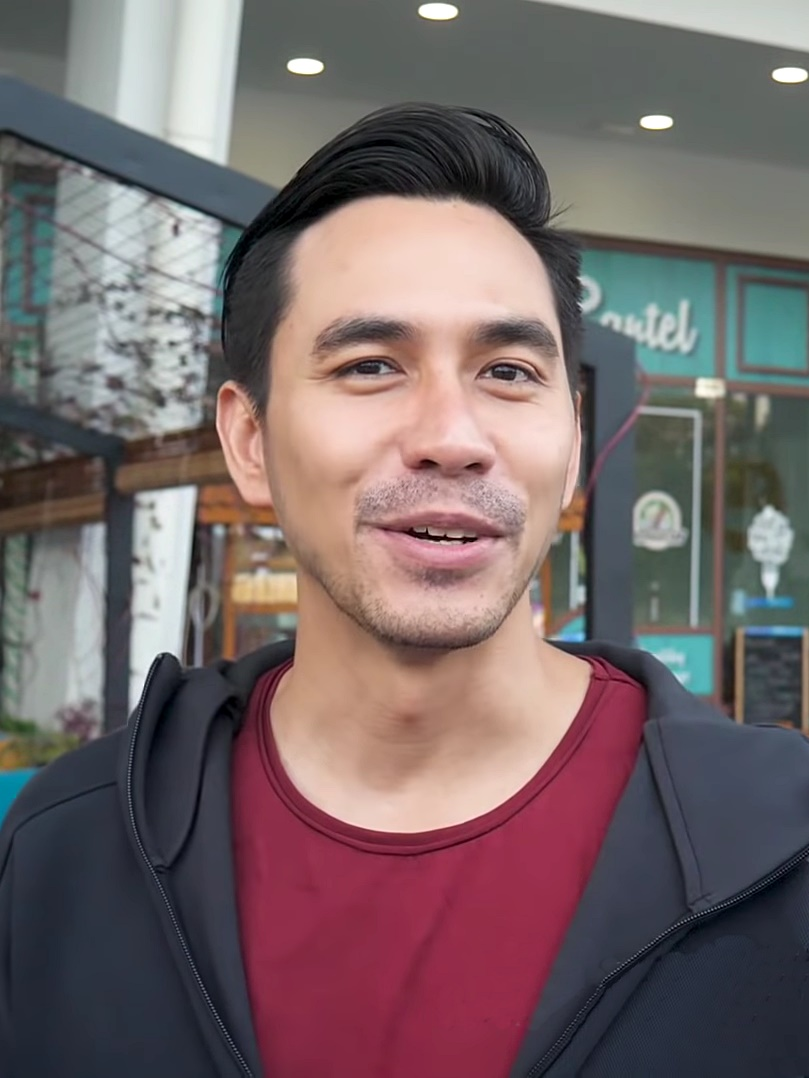
- Darius Sinathrya on Interview with Robert Harianto Perspektif Metro TV
- Born: Daniel Sineon Darius Sinathrya Kartoprawiro; May 21, 1985 (age 40); Kloten, Switzerland
- Occupations: Model, celebrity, presenter, sports manager, singer

Darius Sinathrya (born in Kloten, 21 May 1985) is a Swiss-born Indonesian model, actor, presenter, sports manager. He is best known for his role in film Naga Bonar (Jadi) 2 and hosted programs such as Super Family Quiz and 2006 FIFA World Cup on SCTV.

== Career ==
Darius Sinathrya has starred in soap operas such as Gatotkaca, Hantu Jatuh Cinta, and Bukan Salah Bunda Mengandung. His film career began with the film D'Bijis (2007). In the same year, Sinathrya also played in Naga Bonar (Jadi) 2 with Deddy Mizwar and Tora Sudiro. Several films which Darius Sinathrya later starred in include Pocong 3 (2007) and Love (2008).

In addition to his profession as an actor, he also served as manager of the Indonesia national futsal team as part of the team that won the 2010 AFF Futsal Championship title in Vietnam. However, the team failed to meet the target of qualifying for the 2010 AFC Futsal Championship in Uzbekistan.

Darius Sinathrya was awarded as the most favorite television personality chosen by viewers in the sports event category at the 2007, 2009, 2010, and 2011 Panasonic Awards.

== Personal life ==
Darius Sinathrya married Donna Agnesia on 30 December 2006, in a Catholic ceremony. Donna Agnesia gave birth to their first child, Lionel Nathan Sinathrya Kartoprawiro, on 28 June 2007, six months after they were married. However, he firmly stated that the baby was old enough to be born. Donna Agnesia gave birth to their second child, Diego Andres Sinathrya, on 5 May 2009. She gave birth to their third child, Queenesia Sabrina Sinathrya, on 1 May 2011.

== Filmography ==
Year	Title	Role	Notes
2007	D'Bijis	Bonnie	
2007	Naga Bonar (Jadi) 2	Pomo	
2007	Pocong 3	Thomas	
2007	Akhir Cinta		
2008	Love	Awin	
2009	Merah Putih	Marius	
2010	Darah Garuda	Marius	
2011	Hati Merdeka	Marius	
2012	Broken Hearts	Aryo	
2013	Air Terjun Pengantin Phuket	Alan	
2014	The Golden Cane Warrior	Naga Putih	
2015	Nada Untuk Asa	Wisnu	
2015	Miracle: Jatuh dari Surga	Andri	
2016	Algojo: Perang Santet	Desta	
2017	Susah Sinyal	Aji	
2018	Petualangan Menangkap Petir	Mahesa	
2018	Asih	Andi	
2019	Glorious Days	Adi	
2020	Asih 2	Andi	
2025	Getih Ireng	Pram	

== Soap operas ==
- Bukan Salah Bunda Mengandung
- Gatotkaca
- Hantu Jatuh Cinta
- Lukisan Jiwa
- Si Cantik Dan Si Buruk Rupa eps Putri Tidur
- M-Club
