= Jiangshan High School =

Secondary school in Zhejiang, China

Coordinates: 28.761701°N 118.633981°E

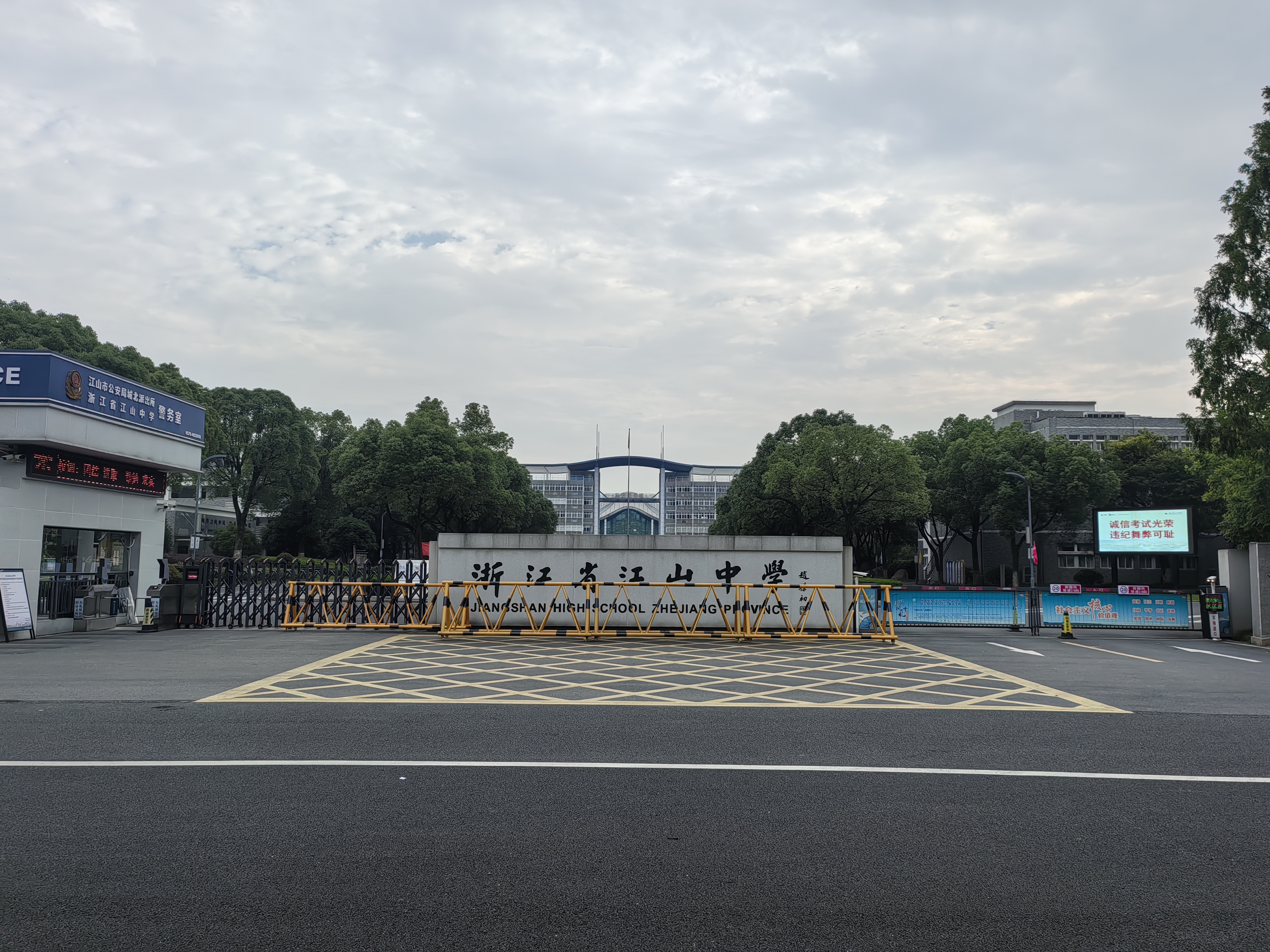
Zhejiang Jiangshan High School

Zhejiang Jiangshan High School (ZJHS, simplified Chinese: 浙江省江山中学; traditional Chinese: 浙江省江山中學; pinyin: Zhèjiāng Shěng Jiāngshān Zhōngxué, JSZX, "Zhejiang Provincial Jiangshan Middle School") is a secondary school located in Jiangshan, Quzhou, Zhejiang, China.

Its origins are in a government-operated academy of classical learning established in the year 1737, during the second year of the rule of the Qianlong Emperor of the Qing Dynasty. The current Jiangshan High School was founded in 1938. The Jiangshan Foreign Language School is affiliated with Jiangshan High School.

On July 6, 2013, 29 students and 5 teachers from Jiangshan High School were on board Asiana Airlines Flight 214, traveling to a summer camp at West Valley Christian School in Los Angeles, when the aircraft crashed at San Francisco International Airport. Three Jiangshan students died in the crash.
