= Kōhaku =

Kōhaku is a Japanese word that can mean one of several things depending on the Kanji used.

Examples:

- 紅白: means "red and white."
- 黄白: means "gold and silver" or "yellow and white."

Kōhaku (紅白) may refer to:

- Kōhaku maku, a red and white decorative banner used in Japan
- Kōhaku (fish), a variety of koi
- Kōhaku Uta Gassen, an NHK music show broadcast every New Year's Eve

== People ==
- Kohaku (wrestler) (born 2001) Japanese professional wrestler
- Kouhaku Kuroboshi (born 1974), Japanese illustrator
- Kohaku Shirayuki (born 1998), Japanese idol

== See also ==
- Kohaku (disambiguation) (琥珀), amber
- Red and White (disambiguation)
