= Someone Like You (2024 film) =

Film by Tyler Russell

- Theatrical release poster
- Directed by: Tyler Russell
- Screenplay by: Karen Kingsbury; Tyler Russell
- Based on: Someone Like You by Karen Kingsbury
- Produced by: Natalie Ruffino Wilson; Tyler Russell
- Starring: Sarah Fisher; Jake Allyn; Robyn Lively; Bart Johnson; Scott Reeves; Lynn Collins
- Cinematography: Trevor K. Ball
- Edited by: Trevor K. Ball
- Music by: Tyler Michael Smith
- Production company: Karen Kingsbury Productions
- Distributed by: Fathom Events
- Release date: April 2, 2024
- Running time: 126 minutes
- Country: United States
- Language: English
- Box office: $5.9 million

Someone Like You is a 2024 American romance drama film written by Karen Kingsbury and Tyler Russell, and directed by Russell. It stars Sarah Fisher, Jake Allyn, Robyn Lively, Bart Johnson, Scott Reeves, and Lynn Collins. It is based on Kingsbury's novel of the same title.

Grieving after the tragic loss of his best friend and secret love interest, the young architect Dawson seeks out her before unknown twin.

The film received predominently unfavorable reviews.

== Plot ==
Architect Dawson Gage has been best friends with London Quinn since their senior field trip to the zoo. They have been very close for the last decade, albeit platonic on her insistence. London's family practically adopted him as he became an orphan at 19.

London tells Dawson she is a match to donate a kidney to her mother, Louise. London hints she might be available as she is single again. Flirting with Dawson while walking backwards, she gets hit by a car.

London succumbs to her injuries. After the funeral, Dawson learns from her parents that she was an IVF baby and there is a twin. He plans to seek out London's biological sibling.

Meanwhile, at the said sibling Andi Allen's birthday, her parents lament never revealing her origins. When her boyfriend Matt hints he may propose soon, they feel it has become urgent.

Dawson learns from the in-vitro doctor that the embryo ended up with private practitioners Jim and Jenny Allen in Nashville. He finds a photo of their daughter Andi, as a recent new Nashville Zoo employee, who looks like London.

Dawson watches Andi working at the zoo. Unsure how to approach her, he spends all day sketching and writing in his notebook. She tells Matt about seeing a stranger sitting there, occasionally looking at her, all morning.

Finally approaching Andi, Dawson tells her he has information about her biological sister, hands her his card and leaves. Confronting her parents, Andi discovers she came from a spare, in-vitro fertilised egg her biological parents could not use. This egg was implanted in, and carried to term by, Jenny.

Furious at Jim and Jenny for not telling her, Andi heads to Birmingham to meet her biological parents. After telling Matt, she meets with Dawson, who is shocked by her resemblance to London. London's parents invite them to dinner.

Flipping through photo albums, Andi sees many photos of London looking like herself. Seeing one of eight-year-old Dawson, she wishes she could have known London. He takes Andi around different parts of town, telling her about their importance to London. At their old high school, Dawson talks about pranks and productions she participated in, mentioning her short-lived aspirations to become a dancer.

Dawson takes Andi to Smith Lake, their favorite hang out, for jet-skiing. When asked if he was in love with London, he admits it but also reveals they were not a couple. Chilling on the shore, Dawson and Andy compare how London was similar and different to her. London loved dancing but Andi loves singing. She admires his lakeside house, which Dawson built. Later, at the Quinns', Andi talks with Louise, marveling at how amazing he is, surprised he and London never got together. Louise reveals she always hoped they would become a couple.

Louise suggests Andi maintain contact with her parents. Certain they are worried about her, she stresses the importance of maintaining her family contact. Andi feels betrayed they kept her origins a secret.

The next day at the coffee shop, where Andi now works, Matt appears. He knew she was being tested to give Louise her kidney. Matt wants to know if they still have a relationship, telling her he got hired at a Nashville law firm. They part amicably.

The day before the transplant surgery, Dawson shows Andi his first project, an open-air amphitheater. He reveals that, although he initially associated her with London, he now sees her as she truly is. He declares that he is in love with her, kissing her.

Once Andi recovers, Dawson encourages her to return home to Nashville, her family, and life. She says whatever happens she will never forget him. The Allens arrive to pick up Andi, and the two mothers thank each other before leaving.

Some time later, Dawson shows up at the zoo. Finding Andi, he tells her he is moving here, as his architectural firm is opening a branch in Nashville. Dawson asks her to show him around the city and also hopes to meet her family and friends. They mutually declare their love and kiss.

== Cast ==
- Sarah Fisher as London Quinn / Andi Allen
- Jake Allyn as Dawson Gage
- Lynn Collins as Louise Quinn
- Robyn Lively as Dr. Jenny Allen
- Bart Johnson as Dr. Jim Allen
- Scott Reeves as Larry Quinn
- Austin Robert Russell as Matt Bryan
- Brandon Hirsch as Carl Smith

== Production ==
In September 2022, it was announced that Fisher, Allyn, Collins, Lively, Johnson and Reeves were cast in the film.

The film was shot in Franklin, Tennessee, Nashville, Tennessee and Alabama.

== Release ==
The film was released in 1,802 theaters by Fathom Events in the United States on April 2, 2024. It grossed $2.9 million its opening weekend and went on to gross a total of $5.9 million.

== Reception ==
On the review aggregator website Rotten Tomatoes, 46% of 13 critics' reviews are positive, with an average rating of 5.1/10.

Sandie Angulo Chen of Common Sense Media awarded the film two stars out of five. Allison Gilmor of the Winnipeg Free Press awarded the film two and a half stars out of five. Andrew Parker of TheGATE.ca gave the film a negative review, calling it "a silly, unknowingly creepy, and wholly earnest Christian romance made for people who find Pumpkin Spice Lattes too spicy and Hallmark movies too secular.
