= Edge of Honor =

1991 film by Michael Spence

- Directed by: Michael Spence
- Written by: David O'Malley; Mark W. Rosenbaum; Michael Spence
- Produced by: Jay B. Davis; Peter Garrity; David O'Malley
- Starring: Corey Feldman; Meredith Salenger; Scott Reeves; Don Swayze
- Cinematography: Billy Dickson
- Edited by: Ellen Keneshea
- Music by: John W. Morgan; William T. Stromberg
- Distributed by: New City Releasing
- Release date: February 1991
- Running time: 89 minutes
- Country: United States
- Language: English

Edge Of Honor is a 1991 American drama thriller movie directed by Michael Spence who also directed The Dread (2007). The film stars Corey Feldman, Don Swayze, Scott Reeves, Ken Jenkins, and Steve Buckley.

== Plot ==
The film begins with an account of impoverished families living on the northwest coast of the United States having taken up arms smuggling to support themselves. A group of said smugglers have just received a shipment of high tech weapons, including one man-portable rocket launchers, but are intercepted and slaughtered by a rival group who take the weapons for themselves. One member of the first group escapes, but is tracked down and killed, along with his mother; his sister Alex survives.

A group of scouts on a camping trip in the rainforest stumble upon a cache of the aforementioned rocket launchers hidden in a shack. Taking some of the weapons for fun, they accidentally drop a map showing their base camp. The arms smugglers arrive at the shack soon after the boys leave. Using the map the boys dropped, the smugglers arrive at the scout camp to retrieve the weapons. When the scouts react with non-understanding, violence ensues and several of the scouts are killed. The frightened boys flee into the woods, with the smugglers hot on their tracks.

The scouts are joined in their fight for survival by Alex, who has taken up arms against her family's slayers. In their final stand, the scouts construct an elaborate trap to defeat their pursuers once and for all.

== Cast ==
- Corey Feldman as Butler
- Don Swayze as Ritchie
- Scott Reeves as Luke
- Meredith Salenger as Alex
- Ken Jenkins as Bo Dubs
- Benjamin Troy as Jason
- Alex "Sasha" Walkup as Eric
- Christopher Neame as Blade
- Steve Buckley as Cantrell
