= Kohaku =

Kohaku (琥珀, Kohaku) is the Japanese word for amber.

Kohaku (琥珀) may refer to:

== Music ==
- Kohaku, a song by Mikuni Shimokawa

== Characters ==
- Kohaku (Dr. Stone), a character in the manga series Dr. Stone
- Kohaku (InuYasha), a character in InuYasha
- Kohaku (Tsukihime), a character in Tsukihime
- Kohaku Ōtori or Unity-chan, a mascot of Unity (game engine)
- Spirit of the Kohaku River (Haku), a character in Spirited Away
- Kohaku (In Another World with My Smartphone), a white tiger character also known as the White Monarch in In Another World with My Smartphone
- Kohaku, an angel and lead character in Wish
- Kohaku Oukawa, a singer in the unit Crazy:B. A character in Ensemble Stars!

== See also ==
- Kōhaku (disambiguation) (紅白), red and white
