= Red and White =

Red and White may refer to:

== The arts ==
- The Red and the White (film), 1967 Hungarian film directed by Miklós Jancsó
- The Red and White (album), a 2007 album by Julian Austin
- Red & White (EP), a 2022 EP by Lil Uzi Vert

== Transportation ==
- Red & White Services, a former bus company in South Wales and Gloucestershire, England
- Red & White Fleet, a company which provides ferry services in the San Francisco Bay Area of California

== Products and companies ==
- Red & White (food stores), a chain of independent stores in the United States
- Red&White, a chain of retail stores in Russia
- Red & White, a brand of cigarettes in Eastern Europe produced by Philip Morris International

== Other ==
- Flags that contain red and white
- The two sides of the War of the Roses, red rose and white rose
- "Up with the Red and White" (Gaelic: Geal 'us Dearg a Suas), the slogan of the Clan Menzies
- "The Red and the White", anthem of the Australian Football League club, Sydney Swans
- Red and White Cabinet, cabinet of Indonesia (2024–present)

== See also ==
- Kōhaku (disambiguation) (Japanese: 紅白), Japanese for "red and white"
- Merah Putih (disambiguation), meaning "red and white" in Indonesian (Malayan)
- White (disambiguation)
- Red (disambiguation)
