= Edge of the World (2021 film) =

2021 film by Michael Haussman

- Official poster
- Directed by: Michael Haussman
- Screenplay by: Rob Allyn
- Produced by: Josie Ho; Conroy Chi-Chung Chan; Rob Allyn
- Starring: Jonathan Rhys Meyers; Dominic Monaghan; Atiqah Hasiholan; Otto Farrant; Samo Rafael; Bront Palarae; Shaheizy Sam; Hannah New; Yusuf Mahardika; Peter John Jaban; Kahar bin Jini; Ralph Ineson; Josie Ho
- Cinematography: Jaime Feliu-Torres
- Edited by: Marco Perez
- Music by: Will Bates
- Production companies: Margate House Films; 852 Films
- Distributed by: Samuel Goldwyn Films
- Release dates: 4 June 2021 (US); 9 March 2023 (Malaysia and Brunei)
- Running time: 104 minutes
- Countries: United States; United Kingdom; Malaysia; China
- Languages: English; Malay; Cantonese

Edge of the World (also known as Rajah (Note: in Malaysia and Brunei Darussalam)) is a 2021 adventure drama film directed by Michael Haussman and starring Jonathan Rhys Meyers as the British soldier and adventurer James Brooke (1803–1868), the first White Rajah of Sarawak. The film also features Atiqah Hasiholan, Dominic Monaghan, Hannah New, and Josie Ho. The script was written by Rob Allyn, who also produced the film. Edge of the World is a co-production of Malaysia, China, the US and the UK.

== Plot ==
The film is based on the true story of Brooke, who has been suggested as one of the inspirations for the Rudyard Kipling story The Man Who Would Be King, and Joseph Conrad's novel Lord Jim. Brooke was a former soldier in the Bengal Army who sailed to Borneo (which was still under the control of the Bruneian Sultanate) in 1839, where he helped the Sultan of Brunei's governor (Pengiran Indera Mahkota, title for the governor) put down a local rebellion, and in gratitude was rewarded with the position of governor of what eventually became the Raj of Sarawak, his private kingdom. He was knighted by Queen Victoria of the United Kingdom prior to being appointed Governor of the new Crown Colony of Labuan. Brooke's dynasty lasted for three generations and spanned a century.

== Cast ==
- Jonathan Rhys Meyers as Sir James Brooke
- Atiqah Hasiholan as Princess Fatimah (Pengiran Anak Puteri Fatimah, the granddaughter of the 21st Sultan of Brunei)
- Dominic Monaghan as Colonel Arthur Chichester Crookshank, James Brooke's cousin
- Josie Ho as Madame Lim
- Hannah New as Elizabeth Crookshank, Arthur Crookshank's wife
- Ralph Ineson as Sir Edward Beech
- Bront Palarae as Pengiran Indera Mahkota (Pengiran Mohammad Salleh ibnu Pengiran Sharifuddin)
- Samo Rafael as Pengiran Badaruddin (historically, this character may refer to Pengiran Muda Hashim or Raja Muda Hashim, the Bruneian governor of Sarawak)
- Otto Farrant as Charles Brooke, the nephew of James Brooke, also known as Charlie
- Shaheizy Sam as Subu
- Wan Hanafi Su as Sultan Omar Ali Saifuddin II, the 23rd Sultan of Brunei
- Peter John Jaban as Orang Kaya (Traditional Bruneian peerage title)
- Kahar Jini as Datu Patinggi Ali (Abang Ali bin Abang Amir)
- Yusuf Mahardika as Tujang, from Iban tribe, James Brooke's personal bodyguard

== Production ==
Rob Allyn, the chairman and chief executive officer (CEO) of Margate House Films, was interested in filming the life of James Brooke, after being introduced to the figure through a footnote in a George MacDonald Fraser novel, which he read in 2009. More research on Brooke led him into a fixation. He also came across a coffee table book in a Singapore bookstore, named "The White Rajah of Sarawak" with illustrations of Sarawak tribes and jungles. After thinking about the film for 3 years, Allyn and his production company tried to make the story into a film starting in 2013, initially naming it "The White Rajah". Later Jason Brooke, grandson of Anthony Brooke, representing Brooke Heritage Trust, contacted Allyn and invited him to make the film in Sarawak instead of Indonesia. The Trust also gave the Allyn access to various images from the Brooke family for film production. In September 2016, the Sarawak Government endorsed the plan and channelled RM 39.01 million through the Sarawak Tourism, Arts, Culture, and Sports Ministry to fund the project. However, later cost overrun increased the cost to RM 48.57 million (US$ 15 million). The project also received a 30% cash rebate from the "Film in Malaysia" Office, a division of National Film Development Corporation Malaysia for choosing Malaysia as a filming location and working with a local production company.

Allyn wrote the film and also produced the film with his sons Conor and Jake, along with Josie Ho, and Conroy Chan. In 2019, the film was renamed to just "Rajah" and the list of starring actors was released in September. Principal photography was shot entirely in Sarawak, starting from 24 September 2019 until the end of October in the same year. Shooting was completed in Siniawan, Bau District. The film was made with the support of the Sarawak Tourism Board. The Brooke Heritage Trust was a technical advisor.

In February 2021, the movie was again renamed to "Edge of the World". Samuel Goldwyn Films acquired US distribution rights in March 2021. British distributor Signature released the film in the UK.

Jamie Bush, a cast member of the movie complained that the film does not reflect the true history of Sarawak. However, Sarawak Tourism, Creative Industry, and Performing Arts Minister Abdul Karim Hamzah replied that it should be treated as a movie instead of a documentary.

== Release ==
Edge of the World was released in the US through Direct-to-video (VOD) and online platforms on 4 June 2021, then in the UK digitally and on DVD on 21 June 2021.

During the 5th Malaysia International Film Festival in July 2022, the movie was selected as the opening film.

In Malaysia and Brunei, the film was renamed Rajah and premiered in cinemas on 9 March 2023.

== Reception ==
On review aggregator Rotten Tomatoes, the film holds a 56% approval rating based on 34 reviews, with an average rating of 5.5/10. The website's critics consensus reads: "Although it falls short as a biopic of the fascinating figure at its center, Edge of the World offers a visually and dramatically engaging glimpse of Victorian-era colonialism." On Metacritic, the film holds a weighted average score of 42 out of 100, based on 5 critics, indicating "mixed or average reviews". Phuong Le, in his review for The Guardian, commented that the movie had "failed to probe the complexity of its fascinating subject", and the "white swashbuckling white saviour Brooke biopic feels out of date". Other reviews noted similarities to Apocalypse Now, especially in the clash between Brooke (Captain Willard) and Mahkota (Colonel Kurtz).

Edgar Ong, a Sarawak-based filmmaker, commented that the film "failed to perform as well as it should but undoubtedly, it would find its niche in television repeats."
