= Taiyuan No. 5 Middle School =

School in Taiyuan, Shanxi, China

Coordinates: 37°50′57″N 112°33′32″E

Taiyuan No. 5 Middle School (simplified Chinese: 太原市第五中学校; traditional Chinese: 太原市第五中學校; pinyin: Tàiyuánshì Dìwǔ Zhōngxuéxiào; lit. 'Taiyuan City Fifth Middle School', short form: Chinese: 太原五中; pinyin: Tàiyuán Wǔ Zhōng, TYWZ) is a secondary school (junior and senior high school) in Taiyuan, Shanxi, China.
