= West Valley Christian School =

Private school in Los Angeles, California

Coordinates: 34.200297°N 118.616384°W

West Valley Christian School (WVCS) is a private primary and lower secondary Christian school in West Hills, Los Angeles, California serving Preschool through 8th grade. it was established by the adjacent West Valley Christian Church in 1978. It previously had a high school division.

As of 1991, West Valley Christian was occupying a Los Angeles Unified School District school campus that was leased by the private school.

In the 2007-2008 school year, West Valley had 120 students in its high school division. In June 2011 the school closed its high school, leaving it with only elementary and middle school divisions. It would have had 35 students in the high school if it had remained open. As of 2016, it serves about 320 students in grades PK-8. From 2013-2016 the school partnered with Carnegie Education Institute for high school operations.

As of 2016, it serves 320 students in Preschool through 8th grade. Campus facilities include an auditorium and a 9,000-square-foot (840 m^{2}) gymnasium.

The school's nickname was previously the "Seekers" as in "seekers after truth and beauty."

The school operates a summer camp for foreign students to improve their English language skills. Three Chinese students from Jiangshan High School in Quzhou, Zhejiang were killed on Asiana Airlines Flight 214 while traveling to this camp.

== Notes ==
- Houck, Emerson B. Go Huskies! Beat Felix the Cat!: the story of America's high school athletic nicknames and mascots and what they reveal about who we are. Bradford House, 2003. ISBN 0974533513, 9780974533513.
