= Merah Putih: One for All =

- Official poster
- Directed by: Endiarto; Bintang Takari
- Produced by: Toto Soegriwo
- Production company: Perfiki Kreasindo
- Release date: 14 August 2025 (Indonesia)
- Running time: 70 minutes
- Country: Indonesia
- Language: Indonesian
- Budget: Rp 6.7 billion ($410,000)

Merah Putih: One for All is a 2025 Indonesian animated adventure film written and directed by Endiarto and Bintang Takari and produced by Perfiki Kreasindo.

The film was created to celebrate the 80th Independence Day of Indonesia. The plot follows a group of children participating in a series of adventures to find their missing Merah Putih (lit. Red and White) flag so that it can be used for their village's celebration of Independence Day.

The film was released on 14 August 2025, three days before Independence Day. The film sparked controversy and was heavily criticised even before its release due to the perceived poor quality, leading to questions over its production. It was negatively received in the public spotlight because its visuals were considered underdeveloped, and the release was seen as rushed.

== Plot ==
The story follows a team of eight children called "Tim Merah Putih" (lit. Merah Putih Team) in a rural village. They are tasked with guarding the national flag intended for the flag salute on Independence Day.

Three days before the event, the flag disappears from a storage room that also contains a firearm. The eight children, who come from diverse ethnic backgrounds—Betawinese, Papuans, Medanese, Tegalese, Makassarese, Javanese, Minahasans, and Chinese Indonesians—work together to locate and recover it.

Their search takes them through forests and rivers and into storms, while they also rescue a Gracula bird. Along the way, they must overcome their ethnic differences and set aside their egos. United by courage, nationalism, and a shared sense of purpose, the children demonstrate that their differences can bring them together in pursuit of a common goal: Finding and recovering the missing flag.

== Controversies ==
=== Production quality ===
The film was heavily criticised due to the perceived poor quality, which is far inferior to that of Jumbo and even the much older Keluarga Somat series. It was criticised even before its release due to poor audiovisual quality, sparking questions over its production.

=== Use of stock assets ===
Some netizens questioned the use of 3D assets and characters in the film, which looked similar to stock assets made by foreign designers that were sold publicly on Reallusion, such as Jayden (created by Junaid Miran), Tommy (created by Chihuahua Studios), Ned, and Francis.

=== Appearance of firearms ===
In the film's trailer, there is a scene that sparked heavy criticism from netizens, which showed the kids in a storage room storing some firearms, specifically assault rifles, with one of them resembling an AK-47.

=== Allegations of state funding ===
The public questioned whether the film was funded by the state. In response to the controversy, the Vice Minister of Creative Economy, Irene Umar, stated that after meeting with the production team from Perfiki Kreasindo, she confirmed that no state funding was involved in the production of the film.

== Screening cancellations ==
On 14 August 2025, the release day of the film, the Cinépolis chain of movie theatres officially stated that it would not screen the film in any of its cinemas. Another cinema chain, CGV, also pulled out of screening the film.

However, other cinemas, such as 21 Cineplex, continued to screen the film on its release day.
