= Rob Allyn =

American film producer

- Born: October 18, 1959 (age 66); California, U.S.
- Education: Southern Methodist University; Georgetown University
- Occupations: Film producer, screenwriter
- Children: Conor Allyn; Jake Allyn

Rob Allyn (born October 18, 1959) is a former political consultant to conservative politicians, turned film producer, screenwriter, media company owner and New York Times best-selling author. He is chairman and CEO of Margate House Films, based at Fox Studios in Sydney. Working with his son, director-screenwriter Conor Allyn, he co-wrote and produced Red and White, Blood of Eagles and Hearts of Freedom, along with the documentary Hungry is the Tiger.

== Early career ==
Born in California on October 18, 1959, Allyn gained his bachelor's degree in government from Georgetown University in Washington, D.C., where he attended the School of Foreign Service. He holds a Master of Liberal Arts Degree from Southern Methodist University and began his career as a Capitol Hill aide, PepsiCo executive speechwriter to Texas Governor Bill Clements in the early 1980s.

In 2004, he was appointed to the board of directors of ACE Cash Express.

in year 2014, Rob Allyn was hired by Prabowo Subianto's campaign in 2014 Indonesian presidential election but Rob Allyn's involvement was denied by gerindra, Prabowo Subianto's political party.

== Media industry ==
In 1983, Rob Allyn founded Allyn & Company, an advertising, public relations and political media agency based in Dallas, Austin, Phoenix and Mexico City. In 2002, Allyn sold his agency to Omnicom and served for five more years as its CEO. During 25 years in the media industry, Allyn served as a political strategist to presidents, prime ministers, foreign governments and political parties.

== Author, novelist, and TV commentator ==
In 2007, Rob Allyn wrote Revolution of Hope with former Mexican President Vicente Fox. Published in English and Spanish by Viking Press.

Allyn was also a television commentator on Fox News and PBS. He has appeared on CNN's Inside Politics, The O'Reilly Factor, The MacNeil-Lehrer Report and Listening to America with Bill Moyers.

== Film and entertainment industry ==
In 2007, Rob Allyn founded Margate House Films in south east Asia. His first film, Red and White (2009) received strong reviews. and won Best Film, Best Director, Best Actress and First Place People's Choice Award at the Bali International Film Festival. The film led to two sequels, Blood of Eagles, and Heart of Freedom.

Allyn also created, wrote and produced the feature documentary Hungry is the Tiger which was selected for the Rome Film Festival Asiatica Film Mediale and nominated as Best Documentary at the 53rd Asia Pacific Film Festival in Taiwan and the 2010 Hot Springs Documentary Film Festival in the United States.

In 2012, Allyn co-wrote and produced Java Heat, a crime-thriller set in Indonesia about an American (played by Kellan Lutz) who teams up with a local cop (Ario Bayu) to track down an eccentric jewel-thief (played by Mickey Rourke). The film was released worldwide in mid-2013.

In 2019, Allyn began working on a biopic titled, Rajah, which tells the life of famed British-born adventurer James Brooke who became the ruler of Sarawak. The film later titled, Edge of the World was released in America in June 2021. The film was renamed Rajah and released in March 2023 in Malaysia and Brunei.
