= Conor Allyn =

American director, screenwriter, and producer

- Born: United States
- Education: Georgetown University
- Occupations: Film director, screenwriter, producer
- Notable work: No Man's Land
- Parent: Rob Allyn
- Relatives: Jake Allyn (brother)

Conor Allyn is an American director, screenwriter and producer from Dallas, Texas, who is best known for the 2021 film No Man's Land.

== Biography ==
Allyn graduated from Georgetown University in Washington, D.C., where he received his bachelor's degree in history, government, and screenwriting. After college, Allyn lived in Indonesia for three years where he co-wrote the first of the trilogy Merah Putih (Red & White) about the Indonesian war of independence from the Dutch in the 1940s with his father Rob Allyn. The film led to two sequels, Blood of Eagles and Heart of Freedom that he both co-wrote and co-directed.

Allyn started production company Margate House Films in 2007.

In 2013, IFC Films released Allyn's action thriller Java Heat starring Kellan Lutz and Mickey Rourke. Allyn directed Netflix original movie, Walk. Ride. Rodeo., which is the true story of rodeo champion Amberley Snyder, who staged a comeback after being paralyzed in a car accident at the peak of her rodeo career.

Allyn directed the modern western No Man's Land starring Frank Grillo, George Lopez and Andie MacDowell. IFC released the film in the US in January 2021 on 260+ screens. The film was #2 among box office new releases on opening weekend.

Allyn executive produced the Mexican film I'm No Longer Here (Yo No Estoy Aqui). He also produced the biopic Edge of the World about Sir James Brooke, a British adventurer who became the ruler of Sarawak in the 1840s. Samuel Goldwyn Films released the picture in June 2021.
