= Italian support for Iraq during the Iran–Iraq War =

Italy provided substantial supplies to Iraq during the Iran–Iraq War. Its greatest impact, however, was financial, with the U.S. branch of the state-owned, largest bank, Banca Nazionale del Lavoro (BNL) in Italy providing several billion dollars in funding for Iraqi military procurement. Italy also was a primary supplier to the Iraqi nuclear program, although that was not of direct effect on the Iran–Iraq War.

With respect to conventional military supplies, Italy provided land and sea mines to both Iraq and Iran. Iraq had ordered naval vessels and helicopters from Italy, although the ships were seized under the embargo.

== Financial ==
Iraq, operating with an Italian-owned bank in the United States, obtained billions in credit from the state-owned, Banca Nazionale del Lavoro (BNL), the largest in Italy, funneled US$5 billion to Iraq from 1985 to 1989. The U.S. branch of BNL made considerable use of U.S. loan guarantees.

On 4 August 1989, the FBI raided the Atlanta office of BNL, the Italian Government-owned bank agency in Atlanta, were transactions relating to Matrix Churchill and its takeover by Iraq, as well as several other firms, including TDG, TEG, and Euromac, that the CIA linked to Iraq's clandestine military procurement network. The branch manager, Christopher Drogoul, was charged with making unauthorized, clandestine, and illegal loans to Iraq—some of which, according to his indictment, were used to purchase arms and weapons technology. He was subsequently sentenced to 37 months in prison.

Iraq subsequently defaulted on foreign debt just before the 1991 war, and the United States Department of Justice announced, on 16 February 1995, the CCC would pay BNL $400 million, in settlement of the bank's claims filed against the U.S. These guarantees were for reducing the risk of agricultural producers and other American exporters in doing business with developing countries. Ten banks including BNL filed claims under the program, and the CCC paid out $1.6 billion to banks other than BNL.

In 1992, it was determined that the 1989 investigation was flawed, principally in assuming that the Italian government was unaware that a state-owned bank, BNL, had secretly lent billions of dollars to the Iraqi regime. According to the New York Times, the investigation was marred by bitter feuding among Atlanta prosecutors, their superiors in the Justice Department and the Central Intelligence Agency.

The 1989 decision, according to the Times, was that the case would have been much weaker if the Rome headquarters of the bank was aware of the loans, it could not have been a victim. Since the bank was state-owned, the scandal could have damaged the entire Italian banking system and caused the fall of the government of Prime Minister Giulio Andreotti. The United States Department of Justice prosecutors said that without the assumption the bank was a victim, the U.S. prosecution would change from a multibillion-dollar matter into a "minor prosecution of technicalities".

The CIA observed that the BNL and other scandals have caused difficulty for Prime Minister Giulio Andreotti's government, three months old when the BNL matter surfaced. While other scandals are receiving publicity, the Italian political consensus seemed to be that BNL could not strengthen its position vis-a-vis Christian Democrat Andreotti.

This did call attention to the "spoils system" in state-owned enterprises such as BNL. BNL's president and several directors traditionally came from the Italian Socialist Party, with a Christian Democratic Party executive director. It was deemed unlikely that this system would change.

"We believe the revelations of BNL's dealings with Iraq--along with other recent scandals--stand in counterpoint to growing Italian self-confidence on the international stage in recent years. After more than three decades of international diffidence, we believe Italian leaders have been pursuing a diplomatic profile more commensurate with their country's international economic role. Italians have felt particular pride because:

- Italian troops in the Beirut peacekeeping forces had fulfilled their mission as defined by Rome.
- The Italian decision to accept U.S. cruise missiles played a decisive role in swinging West Germany behind deployment.
- Their country's GDP had surpassed that of the United Kingdom and possibly France.

In the opinion of almost all Italian press commentators, the BNL affair had a negative impact on Italy's credibility throughout the West. We believe, however, that the setback to Rome's international standing has been substantially less than that portrayed in the Italian press, and we expect the scandal will gradually fade from public view within Italy and will have little lasting impact on the country's perception of its international role."

== Land warfare ==
=== Mines ===
Italy exported land mines both to Iraq and Iran before and during the Iran–Iraq War. Its mine industry revolved around three small companies: Valsella, Misar, and Tecnovar. The latter two were formed by former Valsella employees. All three specialized in landmines and mine-related products and were involved in direct exports and licensed overseas production. Given the limited national market, the bulk of their revenues came from the permissive Italian export rules of the time, approving banks, and government funding of weapons development, these companies were quite successful until export rules changed in the 1980s.

"With the outbreak of the Iran–Iraq War in September 1980, Valsella began receiving government authorizations for exports to Iraq. A total of seven were granted, the last one issued in 1982 and expiring in January 1984. The overall value of the exports amounted to more than US$110 million. But political pressures resulted in increasing restrictions on exports to Iraq. To skirt these restrictions, the company set up a new branch abroad in Singapore, where assembled mines with Vasella components and explosive from Bofors in Sweden, for shipment to Iraq in 1982. A new partnership exported mines to Iraq until 1986.

In 1984, Fiat gradually gained control over Valsella and Misar. By this time Valsella mainly focused on the R&D of increasingly sophisticated landmines (like electronic mines and mines with remote control activation, with radio crypto-coded signals), while Misar carried out considerable research and development of naval mines, though not to the exclusion of land systems.

Also, while Valsella only seemed peripherally interested in selling its know-how abroad, Misar was especially active in foreign licensing and coproduction, becoming an influential player in global production of small, detection-resistant antipersonnel mines.

- Expal, Explosivos Alaveses, belonging to the Spanish group Explosivos Rio Tinto, probably controlled by the Kuwait Investment Office (KIO) during the Iran–Iraq War.
- Spel, Sociedade Portuguesa Explosivos, Portugal.
- Elviemek, Hellenic Explosives and Ammunition Industry, Greece. License n. 9328 dated 17 May 1982. In the early '80s, Elviemek agreed on a production contract in South Africa with the local Armscor Holding, a company having close connections with the Israeli state-owned weapons manufacturer Israel Military Industries (IMI), based in Tel Aviv.

The years immediately following Fiat's take over of the Italian landmine industry did not prove uniformly successful. While Misar's growth continued, Valsella's sales shrank, showing a negative balance by 1986. ... Valsella's managers were arrested on a charge of illegal trading with Iraq. Plea-bargaining in their 1991 trial, they acknowledged having committed irregularities; in December 1991 the Supreme Court acquitted the managers of the serious crimes of illegal arms trade and violation of the currency regulations.

== Helicopters ==
In 1984, Italy's state-owned Agusta helicopter manufacturer sold $164 million worth of helicopters to Iraq. The order was for military helicopters fitted out for anti-submarine warfare, but Rome had needed permission from Washington because the choppers were sold by Agusta Bell, which made them under license from Bell Textron in the United States. [Italian PM Giulio] Andreotti, when asked in 1993 about the sale of Agusta helicopters to Iraq, sat stiffly at his desk in Rome and confirmed with a terse 'si' that they had indeed been sold as part of a top-level understanding between President Reagan and Prime Minister Craxi to try to assist Saddam. 'Certainly the policy were all following at the time was a policy of great support for Iraq,' said Andreotti

— Alan Friedman, Spider's Web: The secret history of how the White House illegally armed Iraq, p. 85

== Naval warfare ==
Iraq ordered four Lupo class frigates, and six Wadi Assad class corvettes equipped with Otomat-2 anti-shipping missiles. Due to restrictions on arm sales to Iraq because of the Iran-Iraq War placed by the Italian prime minister Bettino Craxi, these ships remained interned in Italy until the end of that war in 1988. Iraqi President Saddam Hussein then tried to renegotiate the price of these ships, claiming he should receive a discount due to the delay in delivery of the ships. Negotiations and court proceedings were still ongoing when Iraq invaded Kuwait in 1990 and a new arms embargo against Iraq was placed by the United Nations, again blocking the sale. Although these four frigates and the six corvettes were ultimately seized by Italy under the United Nations embargo during the 1991 Gulf War, these purchases signaled Iraq's intention to upgrade its naval power.

In February 1984, the Italian subsidiary of Bell Textron, Agusta Bell, agreed to sell Iraq eight AB 212 military helicopters equipped for anti-submarine warfare, worth a $164 million. They were intended equip the Lupo class frigates Iraq had purchased from Italy four years earlier. This sale also required U.S. approval, which may not have been obtained.

== WMD ==
In 1983, following the setback of the Israeli Operation Opera attack on the reactor at Osirak, the Iraqis continued to work on building a full processing cycle for uranium and plutonium, primarily using Italian equipment. On 5 April 1976, Iraq signed a contract for a radiochemistry laboratory with Italy, to be done by four Italian firms. Work was completed in 1978. A second contract, signed in 1978, covered a fuel fabrication laboratory, a radioisotope production laboratory, a materials testing laboratory, and a chemical engineering laboratory. While the CIA report was partially redacted, Iraq had some contact with Italy regarding laser enrichment of uranium.

While the CIA did not assess that Iraq had an actual nuclear weapons program at the time of the report, suggesting the activities were more to develop Iraq's general level of nuclear technology. Unless Iraq obtained significant foreign help with the high explosive implosion systems for nuclear weapons using fission; the overall design, fabrication and testing of nuclear weapons; and the acquisition of a nuclear reactor, they could not create weapons until the 1990s. That date assumed no further interference in their programs.

CIA assessed that neither Italy was likely to stop work on nuclear-related contracts, as Italy saw Iraq as a source of oil and a strong market for both military and civilian goods. Stronger nonproliferation requirements, however, were likely.

The CIA report said "...Italy will remain the major supplier of the Iraqi nuclear program. Despite the proliferation risks, Italy will probably continue helping Iraq in numerous areas of nuclear technology, possibly even including reprocessing and plutonium chemistry. Because Italy is a major Iraqi arms supplier, it probably could impose additional safeguards without endangering relations with Iraq.

== See also ==
- International aid to combatants in the Iran–Iraq War
- Iran-Italy relations
- Iraq-Italy relations
- Soviet involvement in the Iran–Iraq War
- Portugal and the Iran–Iraq War
- United States support for Iraq during the Iran–Iraq War
