= Soviet Union during the Iran–Iraq War =

Iran–Soviet Union relations
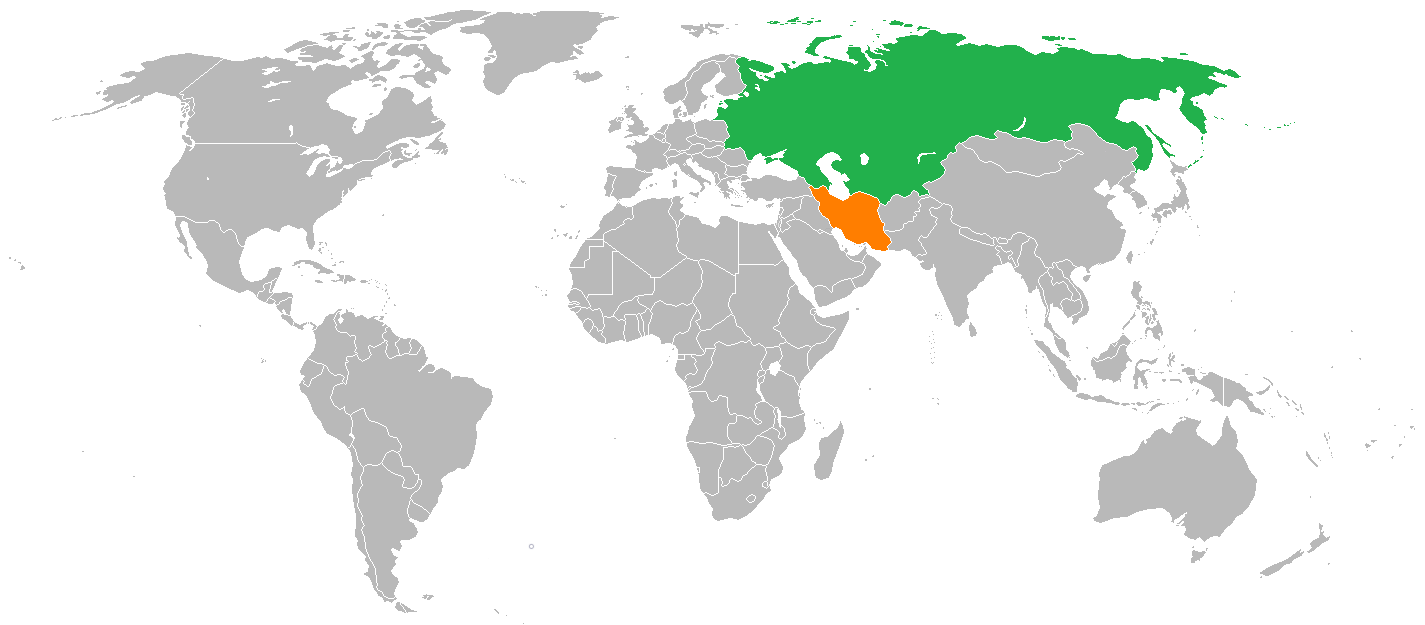

- Iran: Soviet Union

Iraq–Soviet Union relations
- Iraq: Soviet Union

The policy of the Soviet Union towards the Iran–Iraq War from 1980 to 1988 varied, beginning with a stance of strict neutrality before moving towards massive military support for Iraq in the final phase of the war. The war was inconvenient for the Soviet Union, which had aimed to ally itself with both Iran and Iraq. At the start of the war, the Soviets declared a policy of strict neutrality towards the two countries, while urging a negotiated peace. Iraq had been an ally for decades, and the Soviets had tried to win over Iran as well, but both the pro-Western Shah and later Ayatollah Khomeini rebuffed their offers of friendship. After the Iranian Revolution, the Islamic Republic adopted the slogan "neither East nor West."

In 1982, the war turned in Iran's favor, and Khomeini pledged not to stop the conflict until he had overthrown Iraqi President Saddam Hussein. This prospect was unacceptable to the Soviet Union, which resumed arms sales to Iraq while maintaining an official policy of neutrality. The Soviets also feared that Saddam would potentially become an ally of the West, which at the time also supported his regime in the war. After further Iranian gains in 1986, the Soviet Union massively increased its military aid to Iraq. The Soviets were increasingly afraid that the Iranians were encouraging an Islamic revolution in Central Asia. Soviet aid allowed the Iraqis to mount a massive counteroffensive, which brought the war to an end in August 1988.

== Soviet policy towards the Iran–Iraq War ==
According to Mesbahi, Soviet policy fell into three periods:

=== "Strict neutrality" (1980–1982) ===
The outbreak of the Iran–Iraq War in September 1980 left the Soviets in a quandary, since they aimed to maintain good relations with both countries. The 1979 Iranian revolution had overthrown the Shah, a key American ally in the Middle East. Iran's new anti-American stance presented the USSR with a golden opportunity to win the country over to the Soviet camp. However, the war between Iraq and Iran complicated matters. Iraq had been a close Soviet ally since 1958, and in 1972 the Soviet Union and Iraq signed a Treaty of Friendship and Cooperation in which both countries promised to help the other when threatened and to avoid entering hostile alliances against each other.

Iraq, along with Syria and the Palestine Liberation Organization (PLO), had replaced Egypt as the Soviets' chief ally in the region after Egyptian President Anwar Sadat aligned with the Americans, recognized Israel in 1977, and made a peace treaty in 1979. In 1967, Iraq signed an agreement with the Soviets to supply the nation with oil in exchange for large-scale access to Eastern Bloc arms. The Soviets were unhappy with Iraq's offensive against Iran, although they avoided issuing an official condemnation. They were reluctant to supply Iraq with more arms, but they did allow their Warsaw Pact allies to continue doing so.

At the same time, the Soviets still attempted to court Iran. They offered to sell arms to the Iranians in a bid for friendship that was rejected by Tehran because of its historic distrust of Russia and the Soviet Union and rejection of communism. Nevertheless, Libya and Syria, which were Soviet allies, sold weapons to the Iranians, presumably with Soviet permission. The Soviets were also to some extent worried about how the West would react if they opted to publicly back either Iraq or Iran. Their attempt to balance their alliance with Iraq and their desire to win over Iran led the Soviets to observe a policy of strict neutrality during the early years of the conflict, while calling for a negotiated peace.

=== Soviet tilt towards Iraq (1982–1986) ===
However, the Iranians rebuffed Soviet offers of friendship, and by 1982, they also had the upper hand in the war. They decided to push on into Iraq and overthrow Saddam Hussein. That led to a change in Soviet policy from the summer of 1982. The Soviets did not like the implications of an Iranian victory since they feared that Tehran would go on to export the revolution elsewhere in the world. Although officially still neutral, the Soviets gradually increased economic and military support to Iraq to stop the collapse of Saddam. The Soviets were committed to not letting an ally be overthrown, and support for Iraq also played well with many Arab nations (the Soviets finally established diplomatic relations with Oman and the UAE and an agreement to supply arms to Kuwait).

In 1983, the Iranians' actions became increasingly anti-Soviet. The authorities cracked down on the Moscow-backed Iranian communist party, Tudeh, and expelled 18 Soviet diplomats. The Soviets were also keen to counterbalance Iraq's increasingly friendly relations with the West by boosting military aid to Saddam. Iraq became "the largest recipient of Soviet-bloc military aid among the countries of the Third World". In 1984, Iraq officially established diplomatic relations with the United States. This, combined with the outbreak of the tanker war, an Iranian-Saudi confrontation over oil tankers in the Persian Gulf, opened the worrying prospect for the Soviets of an increased American presence in the region. The Soviets responded with yet more military aid to Saddam.

=== Active support for Iraq (1986–1988) ===
In 1986–1987, the Soviet Union definitely turned to supporting Iraq. The war had been bogged down in a stalemate until the Iranians had taken the Faw Peninsula. That, along with other military gains, offered the prospect of an Iraqi collapse. That worrying development pushed the conservative Arab rulers closer to the Americans, whom they saw as their protector. The Soviets did not relish the idea of an increased American military presence in the area. They were also worried about what would happen in Afghanistan, a neighbor of Iran, which they had invaded in 1979 and had been fighting a long war there. Iran had provided support to some of the anti-Soviet Afghan Mujahideen. In March 1987, the Soviets decided to withdraw their forces from Afghanistan, but they were concerned that the vacuum would be filled by an "Islamic fundamentalist" regime.

There was also the prospect of the Islamist Revolution spreading to Soviet Central Asia. The "Islamic factor" became a major concern for the Soviet leadership during the last phase of the Iran–Iraq War and led them to boost arms supplies to Iraq. "The decision to give Iraq the military edge was universal. Not only the Soviet Union, but the entire Western alliance, largely financed by conservative Arab states, engaged in the most comprehensive and massive arms transfer in history to a Third World state engaged in conflict (...) The 'Western package' for Iraq, however, paled in comparison with the Soviets'. Between 1986 and 1988, the Soviets delivered to Iraq arms valued at roughly $8.8 to $9.2 billion, comprising more than 2,000 tanks (including 800 T-72s), 300 fighter aircraft, almost 300 surface-to-air missiles (mostly Scud Bs) and thousands of pieces of heavy artillery and armored personnel vehicles."

The massive increase in weaponry allowed Iraq to regain the initiative in the war. At the same time, the Soviet Union continued to press for a ceasefire and offered to mediate. To that end, the Soviets made several economic concessions to Iran and opposed the US reflagging of ships in the Persian Gulf. However, Iran showed little interest in friendship with the Soviets and rejected the communist world and the West. Soviet aid allowed Iraq to begin a renewed offensive against Iran in April 1988, the success of which led to a ceasefire and the end of the war on August 20 of that year.

== Support for Iraq ==
At the start of the Iran–Iraq War, Iraq was on the offensive, and the Soviets stopped all overt and most covert arms shipments to Iraq for 18 months. While the Soviets did this partially to maintain the possibility of a rapprochement with Iran, the main reason was likely due to its annoyance with Iraqi president Saddam Hussein, who had refused the Soviets more access to Iraqi ports in exchange for arms, and with Iraq in general for launching a war it found highly inconvenient. Soviet prestige was at stake if its arms were defeated by the Iranians, who were equipped with American weapons sold during the Shah's reign. Hence, the Soviets began to provide spare parts and ammunition. They later replaced complete vehicles and weapons in one-to-one exchanges. France supported Iraq and was its second-largest military supplier, and usually supplied higher-technology equipment than the Soviets.

=== Motives for policy towards Iraq ===
"Although the Soviets might not receive payments for several years, the sale of military hardware remained a critical source of revenue for them, and they have tried to retain Iraq as a customer ...

In early 1988, Iraq owed the Soviet Union between US$8 billion and US$10 billion in military debts alone."

— Helen Chapin Metz, 1988

When the Iran–Iraq War began, the United Nations (UN) responded with Security Council resolutions calling for a ceasefire and for all member states to refrain from actions contributing to continuing conflict. A key resolution in 1987 was Resolution 598. The Soviets, opposed to the war, cut off arms exports to both Iran and Iraq, the latter being an ally under a 1972 treaty.

Despite strong policy disagreements with Iraq, the Soviet Union was concerned about the reputation of its weapons, again fearing that an Iranian victory would undermine its army's prestige and turn potential military partners away, so arms deliveries resumed in 1982.

The Iraqi Communist Party, driven from Iraq by the Ba'athist regime, was allowed to broadcast calls for the end of the war from the Soviet Union. That may have been more due to Soviet irritation at the war than a serious attempt to undermine Iraq, since Iran was not seen as pro-Soviet.

=== Competition with other countries ===
France provided Iraq with extensive support, becoming its second-largest military backer, second only to the Soviets, and its supplies were usually higher-technology equipment than the Soviets'. The competition between France and the Soviet Union as an arms supplier was a continuing issue for Iraq. Iraq approached the French in late 1980 with requests to buy Crotale and Roland surface-to-air missile systems (SAMs) to augment their depleted Soviet SAM arsenal.

=== Soviet training ===
Movement away from Soviet doctrine was also seen in land warfare, where the Iraqis learned to place greater emphasis on training and preparation for complex combined-arms operations. This was seen in the training provided to recruits and the use of large-scale battle rehearsals.

=== Intelligence support ===
Iraq improvised an AWACS using a British Thompson- CSF Tiger radar on a Soviet Il-76 airframe, a combination called the Baghdad 1.

Cordesman cites Jane's Defence Weekly as reporting that the Soviet Union had to reschedule its satellite coverage during the more intense periods of tension between Iran and the West. There have been numerous reports that Iraq received intelligence from third- party countries, especially satellite imagery from the U.S. Jane's article suggests that the Soviets also might have provided imagery.

=== Air warfare ===
The Iraqis and the Soviets had different priorities for waging air warfare, shown by how each assigned their best pilots to different aircraft types. This conflicted with Saddam Hussein's strict control of the Iraqi military, but over the course of the war some flexibility did emerge. The Iraqis considered ground attack the most important role and put their best pilots into their French Mirage F-1s rather than Soviet air-superiority fighters and interceptors such as the MiG-25 and MiG-29.

==== Aircraft ====
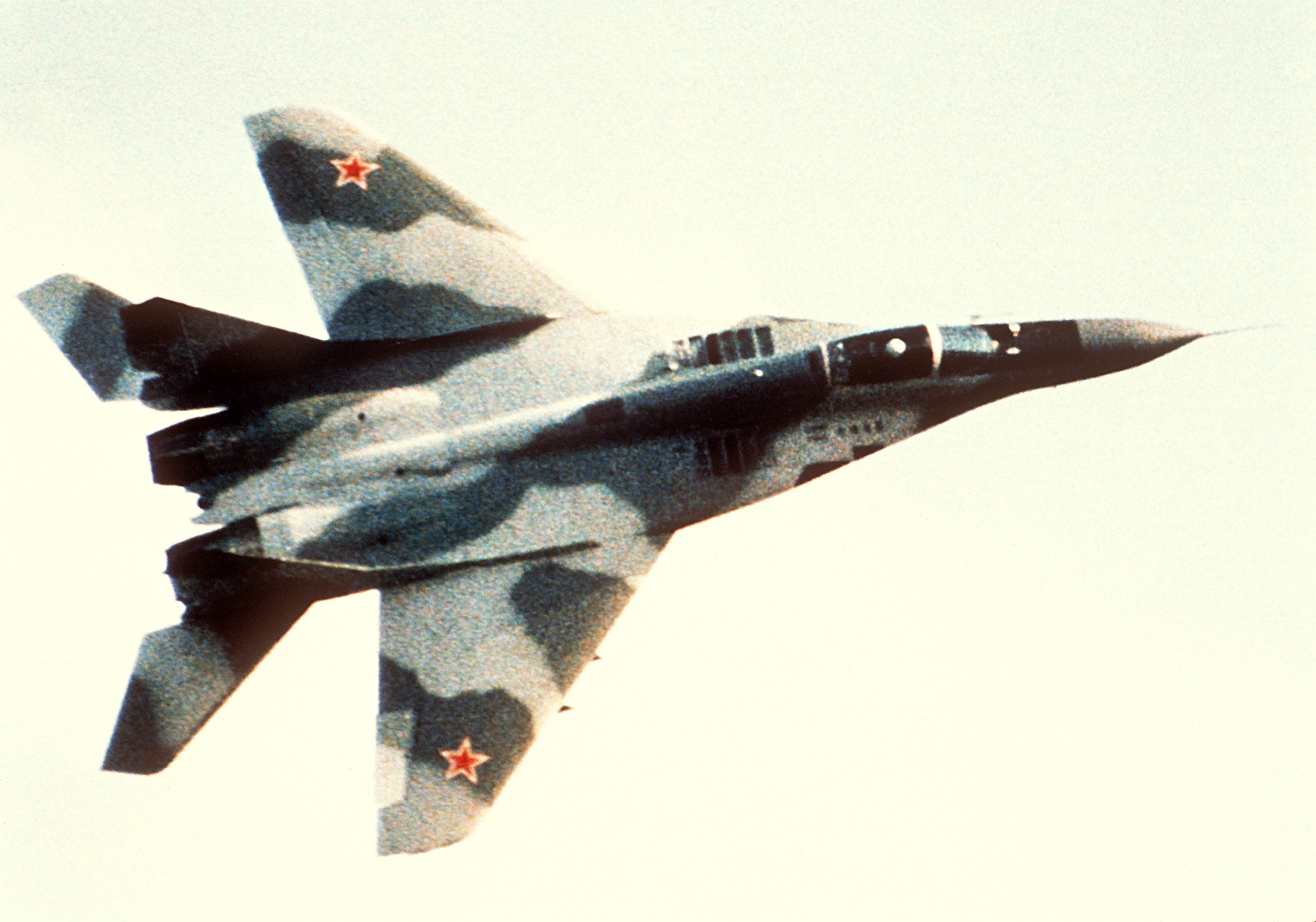
Soviet MiG-29

In 1979, the Soviet Union supplied Iraq with 240 fixed-wing and helicopter aircraft, along with military advisors, initially stationed at as-Shoibiyah Air Base 45 km SW of Basra. In early 1987, the Soviet Union delivered a squadron of 24 MiG-29 Fulcrums to Baghdad. Considered at the time to be the most advanced Soviet fighter, the MiG-29 had previously only been provided to Yugoslavia, Syria, and India. The MiG-29 export deal to Iraq offered a more advantageous payment schedule than any the West had offered, and Iraq was in a financial crisis and needed the low-interest loans the Soviet Union provided.

===== Ground support =====
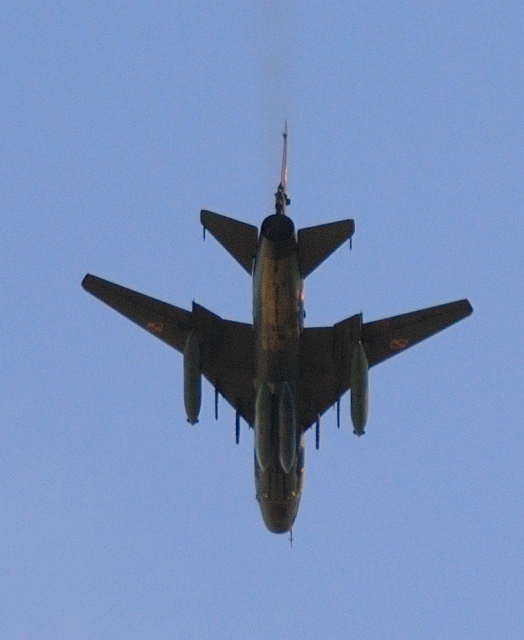
Su-22 version of Su-17

In the ground support role, the IQAF provided aircraft for close air support and strike roles and, to a limited extent, for air superiority over the immediate battlefield. In 1980, the Iraqi air force had 12 ground attack squadrons; 4 equipped with MiG-23Bs, 2 with Su-7 (NATO reporting name FITTER), 4 with Su-20s (i.e., the export version of the Su-17 FITTER C), and 1 with British Hawker Hunters. They also had some Su-22s, the final upgrade of the Su-17 with Russian/French avionics. The IQAF also had two bomber squadrons equipped with Tu-22s (NATO reporting name BLINDER) and Il-28s (NATO reporting name BEAGLE), respectively, though the latter were probably inoperable.

===== Transport =====
Iraq had two transport squadrons whose primary aircraft were Soviet Il-76s (NATO reporting name CANDID) and An-12s (NATO reporting name CUB).

===== Helicopters =====
The 11 helicopter squadrons included Soviet Mi-8s (NATO reporting name HIP) and Mi-24s (NATO reporting name HIND), as well as European-designed models. Soviet helicopters had troop transport capability rather than being attack-only.

=== Air defense ===
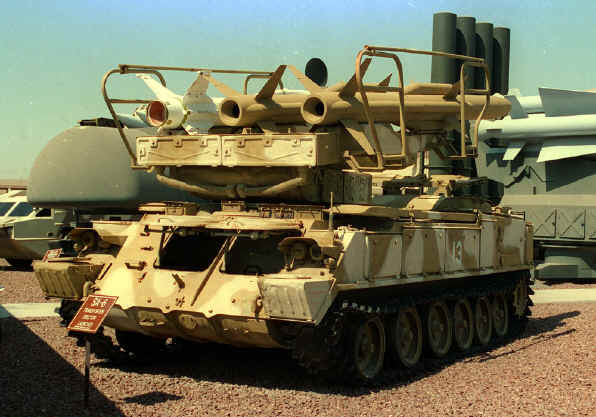
SA-6 launcher in desert camouflage

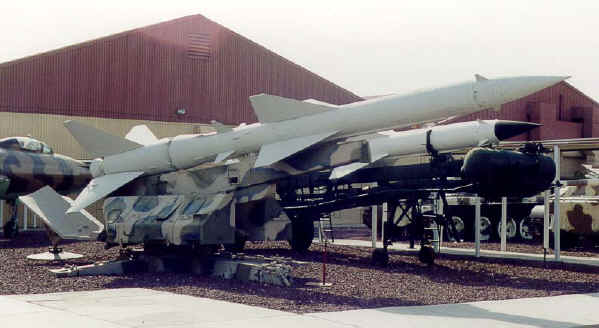
SA-2 on camouflaged launcher

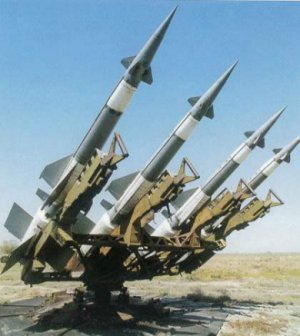
SA-3 surface-to-air missile

Iranian pilots avoided Iraqi S-75 Dvina (NATO reporting name SA-2 GUIDELINE) and S-125 (NATO reporting name SA-3 GOA) anti-aircraft missiles using American tactics developed in Vietnam. However, they were less successful against Iraqi SA-6s optimized for low- and medium-altitude engagements. "Iran's Western-made air defense system seemed more effective than Iraq's Soviet-made counterpart."

==== Surface-to-air missiles ====
Iraq's ground-based air defense suffered from poor leadership and a lack of understanding of Soviet operational doctrine and the technical characteristics of its SA-2, SA-3, and SA-6 surface-to-air missiles. Iraq adopted Soviet deployment and fire techniques and relied on standard Soviet tactics without adapting to Iraqi needs. The SA-2 and SA-3 were designed for medium- to high-altitude threats, tactics the Iranian Air Force rarely, if ever, used. By the 1988 ceasefire, Iraq had obtained from the Soviet Union approximately 120 SA-2 launchers, 150 SA-3 launchers, and 25–60 SA-6 launchers. The Soviet weapons relied on a low-altitude system of anti-aircraft artillery with SA-7, SA-8, SA-9, and eventually SA-14 missiles.

Some Israeli experts came to regard the Iraqi ability to manage the command and control and electronic warfare aspects of their Soviet-supplied surface-to-air missile systems as far inferior to those of Syria, even considering the poor Syrian performance in 1982.

==== Interceptors and air-to-air missiles ====
Each interceptor squadron was deployed at a separate base to defend a specific target. Their five interceptor squadrons had limited all-weather capability and were all equipped with MiG-21s (NATO reporting name FISHBED).

The Iraqis were displeased with Soviet air-to-air missiles. Pakistani technicians reportedly helped the Iraqis modify some MiG-21s to carry the French-made R550 Magic air-to-air missile. The Iraqis claimed to have used a MiG-21 so equipped to down an F-14.

=== Land warfare ===
The Soviet Union initially cut off supplies after being caught by surprise, later reversed this position.

==== Tanks and armored fighting vehicles ====
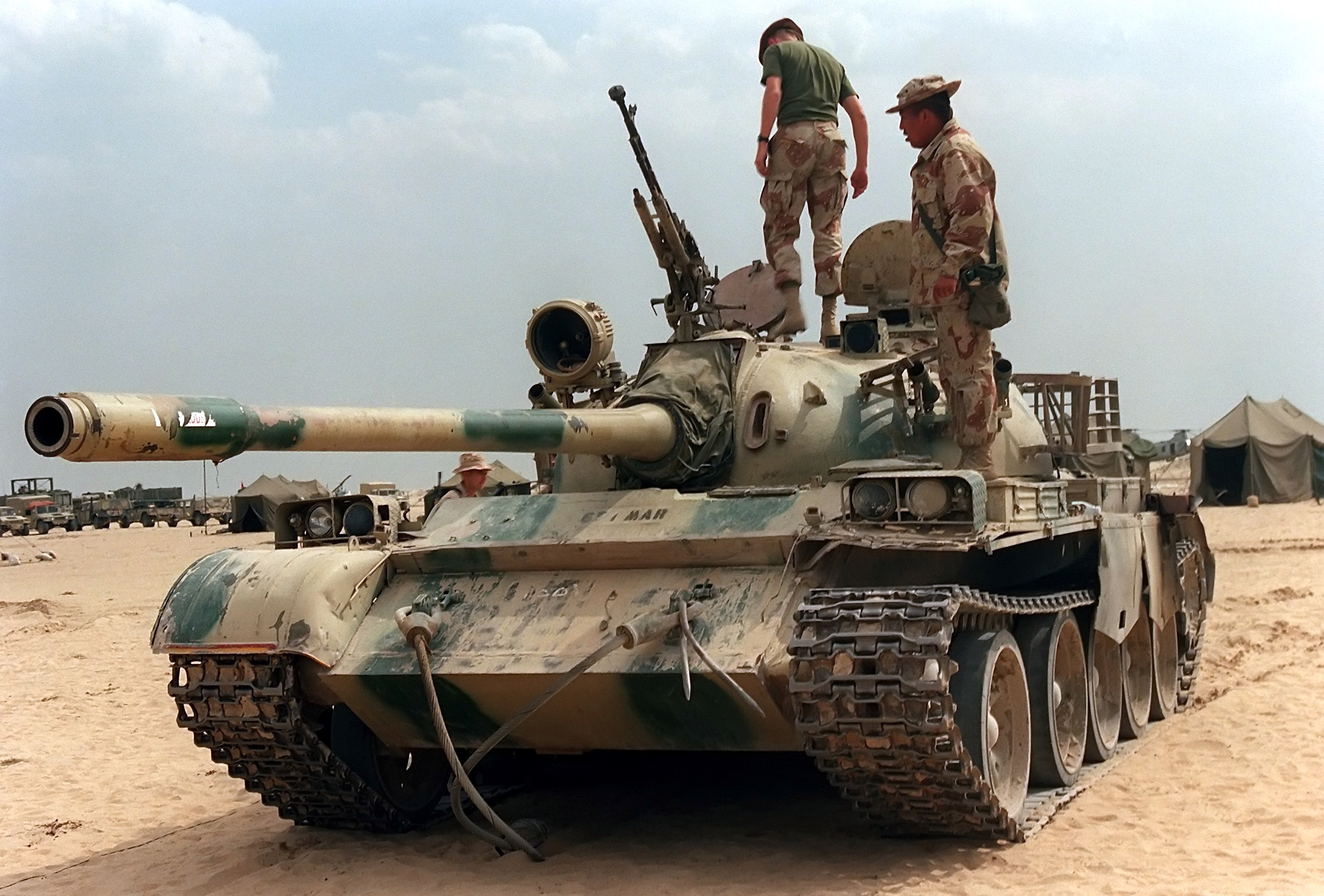
Type 59 tank in Iraqi colors, captured in the 1991 war

Soviet doctrine emphasized tanks, and Iraq followed its example. It consistently improved its skills with tanks, both Soviet-made and Chinese copies. It also used its attack helicopters, employing some Soviet "flying tank" tactics.

Most Iraqi tanks were Soviet or Chinese copies of Soviet tanks, with more acquired during the war. They started in 1979 with 2,500 older T-55 and T-62 model Soviet tanks, and a few more advanced T-72 tanks, probably fewer than 100. Iraq had roughly 2,750 tanks in late 1980. In early 1988, it had more than 4,500 Soviet T-54s, 55s, 62s, and 72s; some 1,500 Chinese Type 59 and Type 69-II main battle tanks (copies/derivatives of the Soviet T-54A); 60 Romanian M-77s; and some captured Iranian British-made Chieftains. It is believed that France also sold about 100 AMX-30 to Iraq.

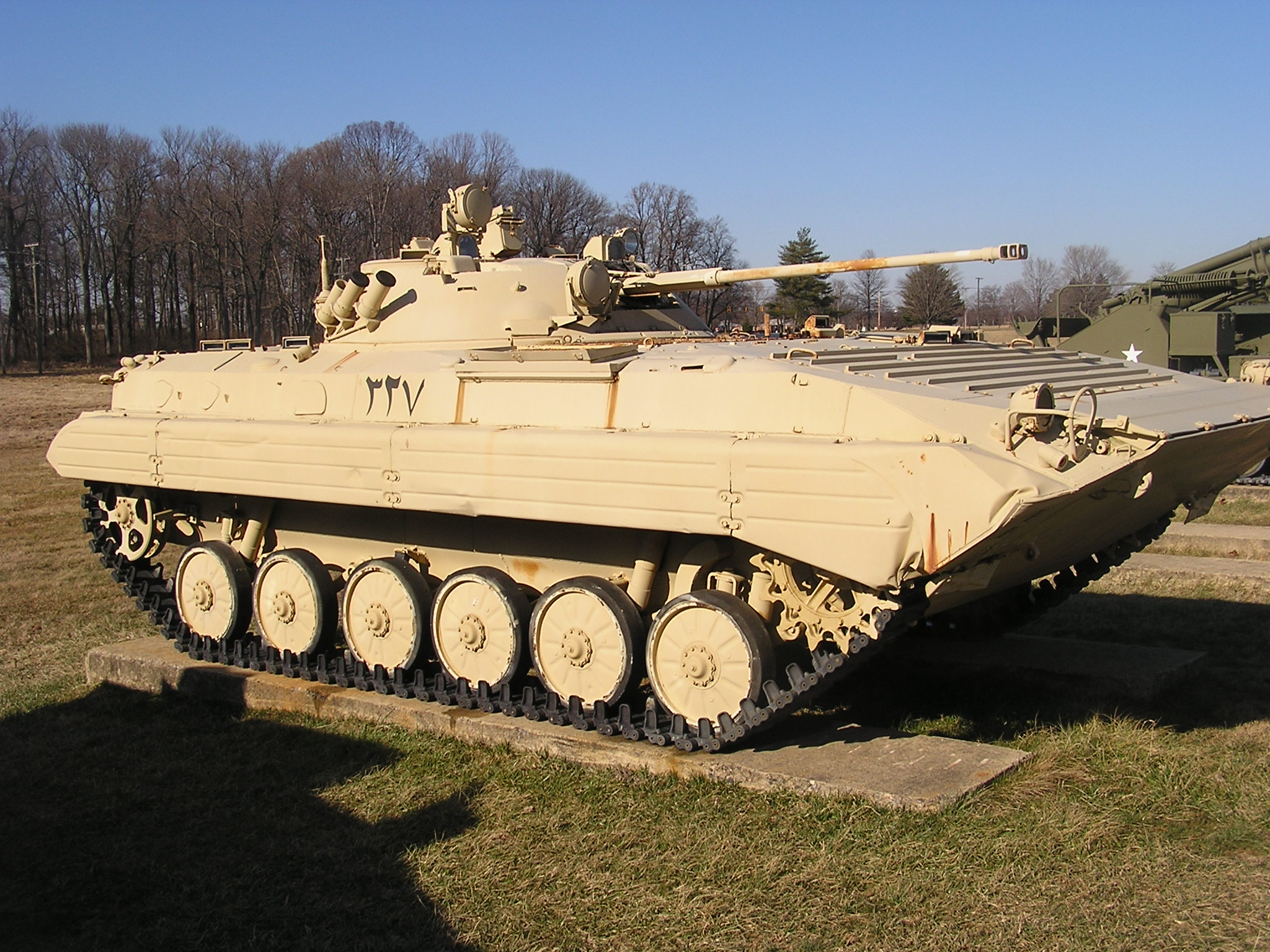
Captured Iraqi BMP-2

Iraq had about 2,500 other armored vehicles in late 1980. By late 1985, Iraq had about 3,000 AFVs. By early 1988, it had about 5,100 such systems, including roughly 1,000 Soviet BMP-1 and BMP-2 armored fighting vehicles. Even during the opening stages of the war, Saddam Hussein was aware that Soviet tank types were individually inferior to those used by the Iranians. In October 1980, he said: "Their [Iran's] cannons are greater in number, their tanks more advanced, their navy can reach long-distance targets, and they have better arms."

Iraq's tanks were more effective against Iranian helicopter gunships. The Soviet 12.5mm anti-aircraft machine guns on the Iraqi tanks were of adequate range and lethality to hold Iranian helicopters out of the range of their most lethal anti-tank guided missiles.

==== Helicopters ====
Iraq still kept most of its helicopters in its air force at the beginning of the war, which created major problems because of a lack of effective coordination between the air force and forward-deployed army units. In mid-1980, it had 35 Mi-4s, 15 Mi-6s, 78 Mi-8s, 18-34 Mi-24s, 47 Allouette IIIs, 10 Super Frelons, 40 Gazelles, 3 Pumas, and 7 Wessex Mk-52s. By early 1988, it had a strong Army Aviation Corps with 150–200 armed helicopters, including 40–80 Soviet Mi-24s with the 3M11 Falanga (NATO reporting name AT-2 SWATTER), and the rest French, and 86 U.S. designs (either U.S. made or built under license) lightly armed helicopters: 26 Hughes 530F, 30 Hughes 500D, and 30 Hughes 300C.

Army aviation had 10 Mi-6 (NATO reporting name HOOK) heavy transport helicopters, and 100 Mi-8 (NATO name HIP), 20 Mi-4 (NATO name HOUND), and an additional 10 French Puma medium transport helicopters.

==== Logistics ====
The Iraqis made logistic oversupply a key operational principle. They operated on the Soviet system of "supply push", rather than the American system of "demand pull". Iraqi forces at the front were given massive ammunition stocks and war reserves. That was necessary because of their Soviet-style, extremely heavy artillery bombardments.

"By the end of 1982, Iraq had been resupplied with new Soviet materiel, and the ground war entered a new phase. Iraq used newly acquired T-55 tanks and T-62 tanks, BM-21 Stalin Organ rocket launchers, and Mi-24 helicopter gunships to prepare a Soviet-type three-line defense, replete with obstacles, minefields, and fortified positions."

The Iraqi Army had about 200,000 men under arms in September 1980, with another 250,000 in the reserves. It was equipped with almost 3,000 Soviet-built tanks, including about 100 T-72s, 2,500 armored fighting vehicles (AFVs), and about 1,000 tubes of artillery. The tank force was a mixture of Soviet T-34/55/62s and PT-76s, plus some 100 French AMX-30s, with more on order. Mechanized forces included Soviet BTR-50/60/152s and BMPs, French Panhards, and British Ferrets.

=== Naval warfare ===
The Iraqi Navy was largely ineffective due to poor training and inadequate Soviet weaponry. Most of the Osa class missile boats were at the lowest level of training and readiness for operations.

=== Chemical warfare ===
A raw, redacted CIA report suggested that the Iraqis used Soviet chemical defense equipment. All units in the Iraqi army had some chemical defense capability, using principally Soviet equipment. The basic vehicle-mounted system consisted of: "BBAR" and "RCH 469" chemical attack detectors; a "GSP12" chemical concentration measuring device; a small chemical laboratory; and night flares and flags to signal the direction of attack.

Iraqi army units of approximately 3,000 men had a 20-man chemical defense unit assigned. This unit was equipped with two "R469" chemical attack detectors; one RS-19, RS-12, or RS-14 vehicle for decontaminating weapons, buildings, and roads; and two "DDA" vehicles for decontaminating soldiers. Smaller units had one-man chemical defense units with a Soviet chemical attack detector and a German Kärcher pressure washer for decontaminating soldiers.

Individual soldiers had Soviet gas masks, and one of three types of chemical defense suits. "Number one" suits, which gave the greatest protection, were used only by chemical units. "Number two" suits covered the torso, hands and legs (in addition to the gas masks), and the "Number three" suits issued to troops consisted of long gloves. All received Yugoslav first-aid packets with two atropine injectors, "tablets for nuclear radiation", and two bottles for spot-cleaning unknown chemicals.

== Support for Iran ==
The Soviets did not provide extensive support to Iran during the war, due to its relations with Iraq, the mutual antagonism between Marxist-Leninist ideology and the Islamist government of Iran, and Iran's strong opposition to the Soviet invasion of Afghanistan, with Iran supporting anti-Soviet Shia militias in Afghanistan. Nevertheless, the Soviets hoped to gain at least some influence over Iran. As a 1980 CIA document put it, "The Soviets see Iran as a greater geopolitical prize than Iraq... while hoping to prevent an Iranian turn to the West and to improve their own relations with Tehran". The Soviets still valued their alliance with Iraq. Timmerman quotes "World Military Expenditures and Arms Transfers", United States Arms Control and Disarmament Agency, Washington, DC, 1985, as conservatively estimating Iran's arms imports from the Soviet Union over the 1979–83 period at $975 million.

After Mikhail Gorbachev took power in 1985, relations improved somewhat. Support began to include some diplomatic exchanges and economic cooperation, laying the foundations for the much-improved relations that developed after the war ended in 1988. While he did not foresee the fall of the Soviet Union, Gorbachev took a long-term view of Soviet-Iranian relations.

After the Western embargo of 1979, Iran was motivated to expand its own manufacturing capability and to seek short-term, clandestine procurement of spares and replacements compatible with its Western equipment base. To the extent the Soviet Union could satisfy these needs, it had an incentive to do so. Some equipment was shipped from satellite states such as Bulgaria, Poland, and Romania. North Korea (see North Korean support for Iran during the Iran–Iraq war both shipped Soviet-designed weapons it made, as well as acting as a conduit for shipments directly from the Soviet Union and China, even though China was a rival of the Soviets for Middle East influence. Numerous Soviet allies, such as Libya and Syria, were providing Soviet products to Iran, and the Soviets did not announce a general embargo on them. That the Soviets were willing to do so selectively, as when they proposed the shipment of advanced naval mines from Libya to Iran, saying they "opposed the unauthorized transfer of their military technology to a third country," indicates that some exports were tolerated. "After American officials told Moscow of the deal, Soviet officials said they opposed the unauthorized transfer of their military technology to a third country and informed the United States that they had made this policy known to Tripoli," according to Administration officials.

Despite the antagonism between the United States and Iran, Timmerman observed that Iran, as the war continued, sought arms imports from countries that were not subject to, or did not comply with, American export restrictions. Some of those countries were Soviet clients or the Soviet Union itself. By 1982, the United States Department of State estimated that more than 40% of Iran's annual $2 billion arms imports originated from North Korea. Much of this equipment was purchased from China or manufactured under license from the Soviet Union. Soviet-bloc weapons were also exported to Iran via Syria, Libya, Romania and Poland, and directly from the Soviet Union. Soviet-compatible equipment also came from the People's Republic of China, perhaps not a superpower but another rival of the Soviet Union. He cites American estimates of Iran's arms imports over the 1979-83 period at $5,365 billion: "$975 million from the Soviet Union, $1.2 billion from the US, $20 million from France, $140 million from the UK, $5 million from FRG, $150 million from Italy, $230 million from the PRC, $5 million from Romania, $40 million from Poland... and $2.6 billion from unspecified "other" sources."

=== Motivations for policy ===
Motivations need to be understood in the context of the Iran–Iraq War (1980-1988), when the Soviet Union and the Cold War were still very real. The revolutionary forces that overthrew the Shah resented what they saw as continued American support for an unpopular ruler. At the same time, the Iranian Revolution, which began in January 1978 and led to the Shah's departure in January 1979, was Islamic and therefore not automatically well disposed to a communist government. Iran, with an import-oriented policy at the time, needed to obtain weapons from one of the superpowers, or at least an ally that made equipment compatible with one of them.

Iraq's invasion of Iran, starting the Iran–Iraq War, came shortly after the 1978-1979 Iranian Revolution and the Iranian Hostage Crisis, starting in November 1979. The United States had been strongly allied with the Shah, who had bought weapons from the West, primarily but not exclusively from that country. Iranian domestic opinion was anti-American because the U.S. had been seen as the patron of the unpopular Shah, Mohammed Reza Pahlavi. The hostage crisis turned a good deal of American public opinion against Iran, so even if the American government, for reasons of state, wanted to support Iran in the Iran–Iraq War, it would face strong domestic resistance. The original American policy of neutrality toward Iran and Iraq, with initial Iraqi military successes, made Iran more eager to find a source of arms, and the Soviet Union capitalized on that opportunity. American domestic opinion was not as much pro-Iraqi as anti-Iranian, which created an opening for the Soviet Union to gain influence in Iran. The Soviets recognized that Iran saw both superpowers as antagonists and remained open to opportunities, especially under Gorbachev.

Nevertheless, because most Iranian equipment and training was American, the Soviets could not immediately provide compatible equipment, which had to operate under doctrines taught to the Iranian military that the revolutionary forces had not purged.

When the war broke out, and no policy was yet in place, the Soviets arranged to fly jet fuel from their bases to Tehran. That was followed by Soviet-ordered shipments from Syria of 130 mm towed field guns M1954 (M-46), tank engines, and ammunition. Arranged by Soviet Ambassador Vladimir Vinogradov, two Soviet-Iranian arms cooperation agreements were signed in July 1981. This agreement also provided Soviet advisors, justified as helping defend Iran against U.S. attack, as in the April 1980 Operation Eagle Claw hostage rescue.

==== Iran reassesses foreign arms dependence ====
After the revolution, from the early to mid-1980s, the Iranians were far more conservative about foreign dependence, and so they focused more on internal production. A Military Industries Organization of the Ministry of Defense was formed in 1969 but was given new authority as the Defense Industries Organization in 1981. According to Globalsecurity, the DIO was, at least, using Soviet designs as a basis for its own work; Iran said it had manufactured an undisclosed number of Oghab rockets by 1987 (i.e., still during the Iran–Iraq War) that were derived from Soviet-made Scud-B surface-to-surface missiles provided to Iran by Libya.

In 1983, the Islamic Revolutionary Guard Corps (IRGC) was also authorized to produce other military materiel. By the mid-1980s, this expanded into the domestic capability to manufacture arms of moderate complexity, such as armored fighting vehicles, artillery, and some missiles and aircraft parts. In all of these developments, direct and indirect technical assistance from many countries enabled Iran to rapidly expand the technical capabilities of its defense industrial base. Those countries included the Soviet Union.

Iran, trying to defeat embargoes during the Iran–Iraq War, had to rely on a complex web of global arms dealers and inefficient black market money transfers, in which money and weapons could change hands numerous times between different countries. Iranians also avoided buying arms from a single source and often pitted one dealer against another, hoping to foil attempts to exert decisive influence on Iranian policy. Furthermore, routes for physical delivery of weapons had to be modified as well, as Egypt and Saudi Arabia began inspecting and seizing Iranian-bound cargo ships through the Suez Canal and the Red Sea; these modifications even included airlifting tanks from Syria.

==== Soviet opportunities to gain influence as part of broad strategy ====
Under Gorbachev, new models of Soviet political thinking emerged, which Francis Fukuyama calls "hard" and "soft". The "soft" variant de-emphasizes shared ideology as grounds for assistance, but generally decreased Soviet military aid to the Third World. The "hard" variant, proposed by Karen Brutents (ru; first deputy chief of the Central Committee International Department) and Aleksandr Yakovlev (Politburo member and head of the Foreign Policy Commission), wants cooperation with "large, geopolitically important Third World States, regardless of their ideological orientation." Fukuyama wrote, "The area of heaviest Soviet involvement with capitalist Third World states has been the Middle East/Persian Gulf. Moscow has...moved closer to Saudi Arabia and Iran...."

As mentioned in the introduction, Mikhail Gorbachev introduced a new model of Soviet foreign policy when he came to power in 1985. Rather than supporting only ideologically compatible states, he pursued country-specific bilateral agreements, including economic cooperation, to offset US power in the Persian Gulf. Consequently, his "new thinking" also seemed to facilitate a change in Iran's views towards the Soviet Union. This thinking may have complemented Iranian awareness of their need to improve their economy. In February 1986, Soviet Deputy Prime Minister Georgy Korniyenko visited Tehran on February 26, 1986, seeking economic cooperation.

Iran agreed to "expand economic and trade relations, and to conduct joint oil exploration in the Caspian Sea." This gave Gorbachev some ability to balance the interests between Iraq and Iran. Iranian official radio broadcast that he urged "increased political contacts". Hashemi Rafsanjani, the Speaker of the Iranian Parliament, said Kornyenko's visit "will have a great effect on our relations with the Soviet Union and the Eastern world...One can be optimistic in fields such as technical, military, economic and possibly political relations. Soviet policy towards Afghanistan and Iraq, however, remained a problem." Iran, shortly after the visit, launched an offensive that regained the Fao Peninsula. Follow-up Soviet official visits, in August and December 1986, resulted in the resumption of Iranian natural gas exports, which had been halted in 1980.

Other opportunities, although realized primarily after the war had ended, involved Soviet technology for components and systems beyond Iran's short-term design capabilities. Iran had reason to explore Soviet willingness to export missile-system components that Iranians could adapt, assemble Soviet aircraft and armored vehicles, and establish licensed Soviet equipment factories in Iran. This primarily happened after the war's end in 1988.

==== Americans consider reopening embargo to balance Soviet influence ====
In 1985, a CIA analyst, Graham Fuller, proposed that the Americans should offer to sell weapons to Iran as a means of blocking Soviet influence there. Robert M. Gates, then head of the CIA National Intelligence Council, advanced the suggestion, which circulated over the signature of Director of Central Intelligence William Casey. Although the section was rejected by the incumbent Secretary of State George Shultz and Secretary of Defense Caspar Weinberger, it reinforces the idea that the Iran–Iraq conflict was seen as a proxy war by the U.S., and possibly the Soviet Union. Certainly, the Soviet Union would sell to post-revolutionary Iran after 1979, when the Americans would not.

Apparently, the Soviets also saw opportunities at the same time, presumably to block American influence. In 1985, the Iraqi Defense Minister said, "Eighty percent of the weapons we capture today (from Iran) are of Soviet origin."

==== Soviets explore opportunities ====
Fukuyama observed that the Soviet policy toward the Persian Gulf in 1987 and early 1988 was complex, with several competing goals. Overall, the Soviets sought to increase their influence in the region, especially if Western navies left the area. When they made the tactical mistake of chartering tankers, they quickly adapted to moving the Western forces out of the Gulf "by tilting away from Kuwait and towards Iran. Over the summer of 1989, the Soviets probably hoped the United States could be frightened out of the Gulf. ... Bolstering Iranian opposition to reflagging would contribute to this result." Such a tilt would serve the objective of building influence with Iran, while offsetting the United States' extensive support to Kuwait.

=== Export controls ===
Under the Soviet system, there was little incentive for highly profitable arms exports. Instead, Soviet arms exports were governed first and foremost by military secrecy. If the military determined that a particular piece of equipment, manufacturing technology, or other information was ahead of the equivalent in the West, it would not be available for export, and the Soviet Union's foreign military sales organizations had no means to appeal.

If there was a question of sensitivity, traditional Soviet decision-making was for more, not less, secrecy. Every decision about exporting items of perceived military significance was made centrally, with input from the Party, military, and State Security (KGB). If a decision was made in favor of exporting, it reflected government consensus.

In 1981, a CIA document said that the Soviet Union was likely to hasten the delivery of $220 million in "ground equipment" and to permit Eastern European countries to "selectively provide some items in short supply."

=== Military training and advice ===
The Iranians described the July 1981 military agreements as defensive. They covered training and construction of Iranian bases, but also the construction of Soviet signals intelligence SIGINT bases (see Command, control, communications and intelligence below). There were agreements to train Iranian personnel in Soviet military schools and cooperate with the revolutionary secret police, SAVAMA.

Advisors were to wear distinctive uniforms that did not identify them as Soviets, and were to have their expenses paid in U.S. dollars. The number grew to 3000 by mid-1983, and 4200 in March 1987.

=== Command, control, communications, and intelligence (C3I) ===
Soviet personnel, in late 1981, started construction of a surveillance station in Balochistan, in a location that gave a view of the Afghan and Pakistani borders. Radar at that base could monitor all naval traffic through the Strait of Hormuz. They could also monitor supplies to the Afghan resistance that came through Pakistan.

The Soviets also established a base in Balochistan, where, starting in late 1981, they began work on a network of ground surveillance stations linked to an enormous listening base dug into the side of Kuh-e-Malek-Siah mountain, which dominated the Iranian-Afghan-Pakistani border. Iran allowed this because it was concerned about the increasingly warm relations between Pakistan, the U.S., and the Arab states of the Persian Gulf. Tehran also agreed to let the installation be built due to the presence of listening stations in Pakistan, tuning in on Iran with American help.

Complementing the first station at Kuh-e-Malek-Siah, an intelligence base at Gardaneh Pireh Zan allowed surveillance of air activity in northern Saudi Arabia. Coupled with other Soviet intelligence facilities in South Yemen, Ethiopia, and Syria, the installations achieved complete coverage of the Arabian Peninsula.

Smaller intelligence bases ran on a line from Khash, Paskouh, Faslabad, Kalateh-Shah-Taghi, and in the Birag valley. These were operational by 1983–1984.

=== Land warfare ===
Both sides captured tanks and other major equipment from the other. Iran developed an enhanced version of the T-54/T-55 tank. It is unclear whether Iran ever obtained Russian spare parts for this older tank.

=== Air warfare ===
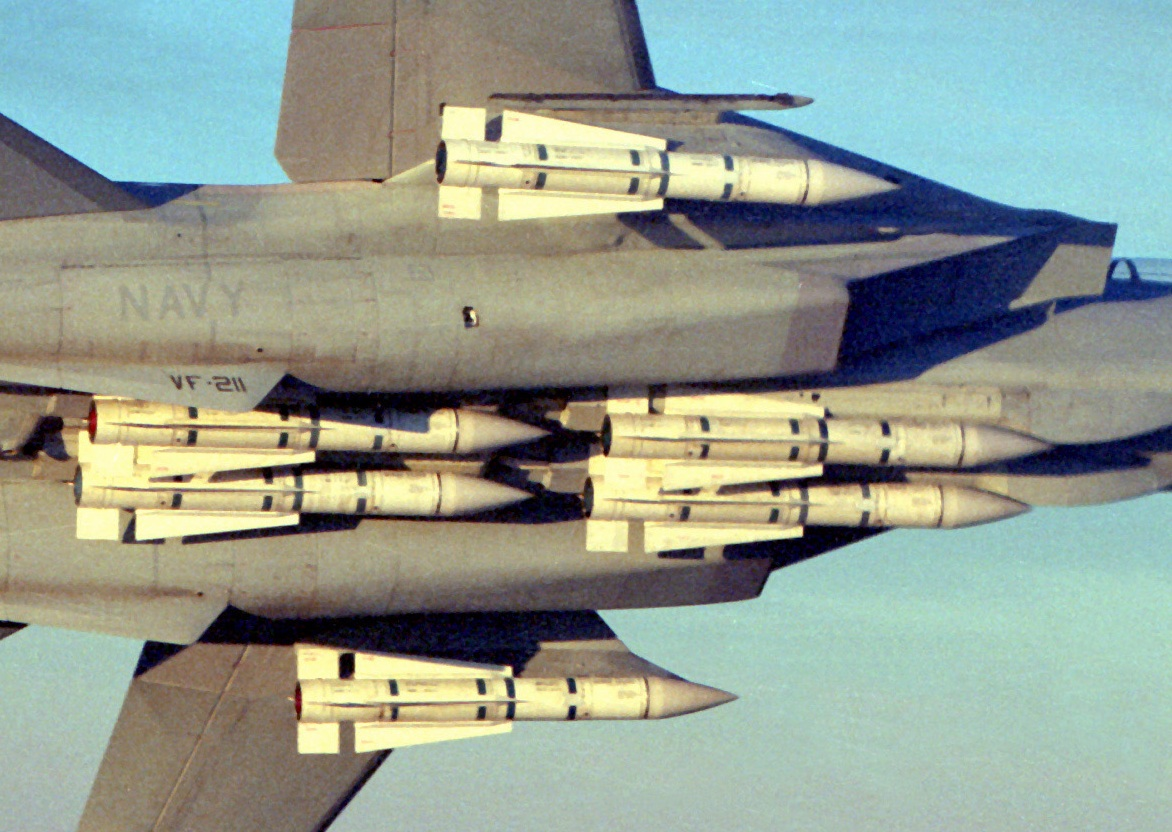
F-14 fighter with maximum Phoenix missile load

While the U.S. officially embargoed parts for the F-14 and its specialized AIM-54 Phoenix long-range air-to-air missile, and reports suggest U.S. technicians leaving Iran after the Revolution sabotaged critical parts, the Iranian Air Force found a new role for its F-14 fighters: command and control. Its AN/AWG-9 radar, unique in capability at the time, allowed Iran to use the F-14s not as front-line fighters, but as "mini-AWACS" early-warning and tactical-control platforms.

The F-14 and Phoenix have been retired from American service, and there have been recent reports of Iran getting spare parts from surplus sales. Obviously, current surplus sales did not affect F-14/AWG-9 use in the war under discussion. Still, the Associated Press report on the current market quoted Greg Kutz, head of special investigations for the U.S. General Accounting Office, as saying, "He believes Iran already has Tomcat parts from Pentagon surplus sales: 'The key now is, going forward, to shut that down and not let it happen again.'"

For Iran, the radar is the critical component for the F-14 system. The Phoenix missile was designed to engage Soviet bombers at very long ranges in the Outer Air Battle component of the defense of an aircraft carrier battle group, and Iran faces few threats of this type.

==== Aircraft ====
There have been American industry reports that at least one F-14 crew defected to the Soviet Union. This might have been an intelligence coup.

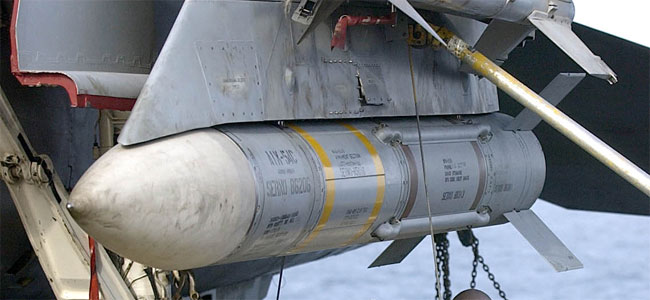
AIM-54 Phoenix; forward wings not yet attached

==== Weapons ====
These reports suggested that the Vympel R-33 missile (NATO reporting name AMOS AA-9) was reverse-engineered. Gennadiy Sokolovskiy of the Vympel Design Bureau denies that the R-33 was based on the AIM-54 Phoenix, maintaining that he has never actually seen a live Phoenix.

F-14 aircraft in Iranian service also carry the AIM-9 Sidewinder and AIM-7 Sparrow missiles, plus a 20mm cannon; all of them are more appropriate for the likely type of combat those aircraft would face. Given their unique radar capability, Iran would be more likely to hold back its F-14s and use other fighters, such as the F-4 Phantom, for close engagements.

=== Air defense ===
During the war, Iran lacked an integrated air defense system. It did have local air defense systems at Tehran and Kharg Island, a key Iranian oil facility.

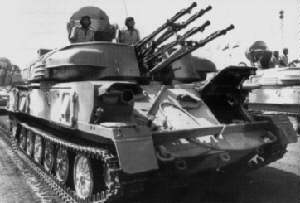
ZSU-23-4 Shilka mobile antiaircraft vehicle, used by both Iran and Iraq

Soviet antiaircraft artillery was a key and predictable part of these local defenses, since Iran had significant difficulties obtaining spare parts for its U.S. MIM-23 Hawk surface-to-air missiles. These included Soviet anti-aircraft artillery and short-range missiles. It is not established how Iran acquired these weapons, which are short-range and presumably used as final point defenses.

==== Antiaircraft artillery ====
The Kharg Island defenses included the well-regarded ZSU-23-4 radar-controlled 23mm anti-aircraft cannon.

==== Surface-to-air missiles ====
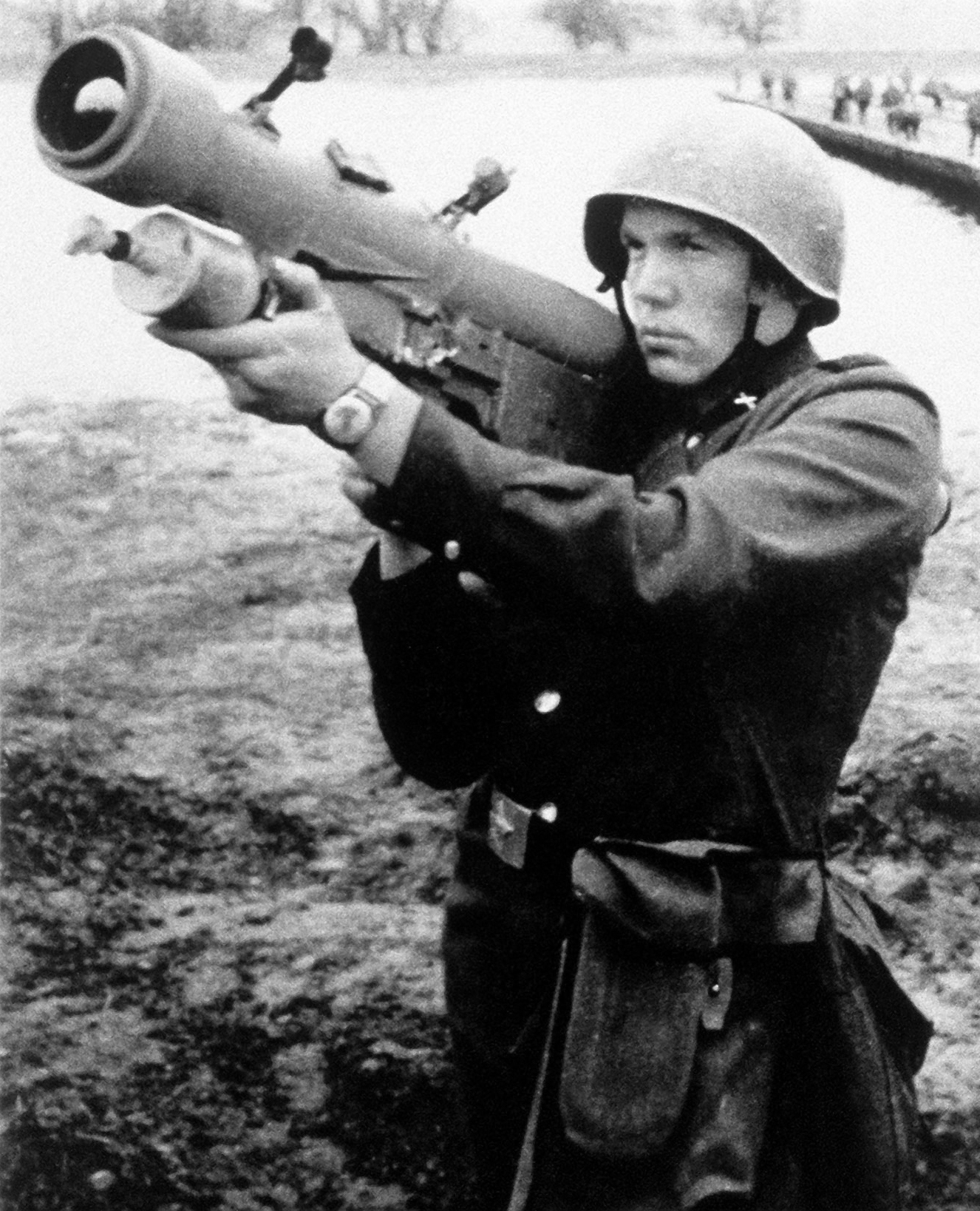
SA-7 ready to fire

Also part of the Kharg Island air defenses were shoulder-fired Strela SA-7 surface-to-air missiles. These missiles have a limited shelf life under less-than-ideal storage conditions, so they could not have been acquired too long before the Revolution.

=== Missile technology ===
In 1985, Iran recognized that the embargo forced it to simplify its domestic production goals. One goal was surface-to-surface missiles, which, given the disparity in size and design objectives, are cheaper and less complex than a multirole fighter aircraft such as the American F-4 Phantom, which was the backbone of the Iranian Air Force.

Iran obtained technical assistance from several countries, including China, North Korea, Pakistan, Libya, Israel, Argentina, Brazil, West Germany, East Germany, Taiwan, and the Soviet Union. Of these, the Soviet Union clearly had the greatest missile expertise in 1985. Iran used Scud-B SSMs, presumed to be of Libyan origin, and to which the Soviets voiced no objection.

== See also ==
- International aid to combatants in the Iran–Iraq War
- Iran–Russia relations
- Iraq–Russia relations
- Soviet support for Iran during the Iran–Iraq war
- Soviet support for Iraq during the Iran–Iraq war
- Italian support for Iraq during the Iran–Iraq war
- Iran–Contra affair (clandestine US military supplies to Iran)
- Israel's role in the Iran–Iraq war

== Sources ==
- Mohiaddin Mesbahi: "The USSR and the Iran–Iraq War: From Brezhnev to Gorbachev" in Farhang Rajaee (ed.) The Iran–Iraq War: The Politics of Aggression (University Press of Florida, 1993)
- Kazem Sajjadpour: "Neutral Statements, Committed Practice: The USSR and the War" in Farhang Rajaee (ed.) Iranian Perspectives on the Iran–Iraq War (University Press of Florida, 1997)
- Oles M. Smolansky The USSR and Iraq: The Soviet Quest for Influence (Duke University Press, 1991)
