= SIPRI Arms Transfers Database, Iraq 1973–1990 =

The Stockholm International Peace Research Institute, SIPRI, Arms Transfers Database contains information on all international transfers of major weapons (including sales, gifts and production under licence) to states, international organizations and armed non-state groups since 1950. It is the only publicly available resource providing consistent data on arms transfers for this length of time. The database can be used to track transfers of major weapons and to answer such questions as:

- Who are the main suppliers and recipients of major weapons?
- How have relations between different suppliers and recipients changed over time?
- Where do countries in conflict get their weapons?
- How do states implement their export control regulations?
- Where are potentially destabilizing build-ups of weapons occurring today?
- What major weapons have been exported or imported?

== Imports of conventional arms by Iraq 1973–1990, by source ==
Values are shown in millions of US dollars at constant (1990) estimated values. "Soviet Union and Warsaw Pact" includes Czechoslovakia, East Germany, Hungary, Poland, and Romania. The majority of these transfers came from the Soviet Union, followed by Czechoslovakia.

Year	Soviet Union and Warsaw Pact	France	China (PRC)	United States	Egypt	Others	Total
1973	1,321	5	0	0	0	0	1,326
1974	1,471	5	0	0	0	0	1,476
1975	1,087	35	0	0	0	0	1,122
1976	1,161	119	0	0	0	0	1,280
1977	1,062	106	0	0	0	0	1,168
1978	1,827	26	0	0	0	20	1,873
1979	1,108	78	0	0	0	17	1,203
1973–79	9,037	374	0	0	0	37	9,448
1973–79	95.7%	4.0%	0%	0%	0%	0.4%	100%
1980	1,665	241	0	0	12	114	2,032
1981	1,780	731	0	0	46	182	2,739
1982	2,023	673	217	0	71	227	3,211
1980–82	5,468	1,645	217	0	129	523	7,982
1980–82	68.5%	20.6%	2.7%	0%	1.6%	6.6%	100%
1983	1,898	779	745	21	58	773	4,274
1984	2,857	883	1,065	6	0	116	4,927
1985	2,601	700	1,036	9	32	116	4,494
1986	2,663	251	918	9	70	86	3,997
1987	2,719	214	887	30	114	157	4,121
1988	1,202	355	301	125	118	196	2,297
1983–88	13,940	3,182	4,952	200	392	1,444	24,110
1983–88	57.8%	13.2%	20.5%	0.8%	1.6%	6.0%	100%
1989	1,319	113	23	0	47	67	1,569
1990	537	281	0	0	0	33	851
Total $	30,301	5,595	5,192	200	568	2,104	43,960
Total %	68.9%	12.7%	11.8%	0.5%	1.3%	4.8%	100%

The Stockholm International Peace Research Institute (SIPRI) makes the following comment of the methodology of this table:

^{The SIPRI data on arms transfers refer to actual deliveries of major conventional weapons. To permit comparison between the data on such deliveries of different weapons and identification of general trends, SIPRI uses a trend-indicator value. The SIPRI values are therefore only an indicator of the volume of international arms transfers and not of the actual financial values of such transfers.}

SIPRI's data are founded entirely on open sources:

^{The type of open information used by SIPRI cannot provide a comprehensive picture of world arms transfers. Published reports often provide only partial information, and substantial disagreement among reports is common. Order and delivery dates, exact numbers, types of weapon and the identity of suppliers or recipients may not always be clear.}

== Arms suppliers to Iraq ==
The table shows the majority of conventional arms imported by Iraq during the 1970s, when the regime was building up the armies which were to attack Iran in 1980, were supplied by the Soviet Union and its satellites, principally Czechoslovakia. The only substantial Western arms supplier to Iraq was France, which continued to be a major supplier until 1990, when Iraq invaded Kuwait and all legal arms transfers to Iraq ended.

The United States did not supply any arms to Iraq until 1982, when Iran's growing military success alarmed American policymakers. It then did so every year until 1988. These sales amounted to less than 1% of the total arms sold to Iraq in the relevant period. Although most other countries never hesitated to sell military hardware directly to Saddam Hussein's regime, the U.S., equally keen to protect its interests in the region, opted for and developed an indirect approach. The CIA began covertly directing non-U.S. origin hardware to Hussein's armed forces, "to ensure that Iraq had sufficient military weapons, ammunition and vehicles to avoid losing the Iran-Iraq war." The full extent of these transfers is not yet known, and details do not appear in the SIPRI Arms Transfers Database, which relies entirely on open sources.

In 1996, the Scott Report in the United Kingdom investigated arms sales to Iraq in the 1980s by Matrix Churchill in what became known as the Arms-to-Iraq scandal.

== Table of major conventional arms sales to Iraq by country ==
Country	Weapon designation	Weapon description	Year(s) delivered	Quantity delivered
Austria	GHN-45 155mm	Towed Gun	1983	200
Brazil	EMB-312 Tucano	Trainer aircraft	1985-1988	80
Brazil	Astros II MLRS	Multiple rocket launcher	1984-1988	67
Brazil	EE-11 Urutu	APC	1983-1984	350
Brazil	EE-3 Jararaca	Recon vehicle	1984-1985	280
Brazil	EE-9 Cascavel	Armoured car	1980-1989	1026
Brazil	Astros AV-UCF	Fire control radar	1984-1988	13
Canada	PT-6	Turboprop	1980-1990	152
China	Xian H-6	Bomber aircraft	1988	4
China	F-6	Fighter aircraft	1982-1983	40
China	F-7A	Fighter aircraft	1983-1987	80
China	Type-63 107mm	Multiple rocket launcher	1984-1988	100
China	Type-83 152mm	Towed gun	1988-1989	50
China	W-653/Type-653	ARV	1986-1987	25
China	WZ-120/Type-59	Tank	1982-1987	1000
China	WZ-121/Type 69	Tank	1983-1987	1500
China	YW-531/Type-63	APC	1982-1988	650
China	CEIEC-408C	Air surv radar	1986-1988	5
China	HN-5A	Portable SAM	1986-1987	1000
China	HY-2/SY1A/CSS-N-2	Anti-ship missile	1987-1988	200
Czechoslovakia	L-39Z Albatross	Trainer/combat aircraft	1976-1985	59
Czechoslovakia	BMP-1	Infantry fighting vehicle	1981-1987	750
Czechoslovakia	BMP-2	Infantry fighting vehicle	1987-1989	250
Czechoslovakia	OT-64C	APC	1981	200
Czechoslovakia	T-55	Tank	1982-1985	400
Denmark	Al Zahraa	Landing ship	1983	3
East Germany	T-55	Tank	1981	50
Egypt	D-30 122mm	Towed gun	1985-1989	210
Egypt	M-46 130mm	Towed gun	1981-1983	96
Egypt	RL-21 122mm	Multiple rocket launcher	1987-1989	300
Egypt	T-55	Tank	1981-1983	300
Egypt	Walid	APC	1980	100
France	Mirage F-1C	Fighter aircraft	1982-1990	106
France	Mirage F-1E	FGA aircraft	1980-1982	19
France	SA-312H Super Frelon	Helicopter	1981	6
France	SA-330 Puma	Helicopter	1980-1981	20
France	SA-342K/L Gazelle	Light helicopter	1980-1988	38
France	Super Etendard	FGA aircraft	1983	5
France	AMX-GCT/AU-F1	Self-propelled gun	1983-1985	85
France	AMX-10P	Infantry fighting vehicle	1981-1982	100
France	AMX-30D	ARV	1981	5
France	ERC-90	Armoured car	1980-1984	200
France	M-3 VTT	APC	1983-1984	115
France	VCR-TH	Tank destroyer	1979-1981	100
France	Rasit	Ground surv radar	1985	2
France	Roland	Mobile SAM system	1982-1985	113
France	TRS-2100 Tiger	Air surv radar	1988	1
France	TRS-2105/6 Tiger-G	Air surv radar	1986-1989	5
France	TRS-2230/15 Tiger	Air surv radar	1984-1985	6
France	Volex	Air surv radar	1981-1983	5
France	AM-39 Exocet	Anti-ship missile	1979-1988	352
France	ARMAT	Anti-radar missile	1986-1990	450
France	AS-30L	ASM	1986-1990	240
France	HOT	Anti-tank missile	1981-1982	1000
France	R-550 Magic-1	SRAAM	1981-1985	534
France	Roland-2	SAM	1981-1990	2260
France	Super 530F	BVRAAM	1981-1985	300
West Germany	BK-117	Helicopter	1984-1989	22
West Germany	Bo-105C	Light Helicopter	1979-1982	20
West Germany	Bo-105L	Light Helicopter	1988	6
Hungary	PSZH-D-994	APC	1981	300
Italy	A-109 Hirundo	Light Helicopter	1982	2
Italy	S-61	Helicopter	1982	6
Italy	Stromboli class	Support ship	1981	1
Jordan	S-76 Spirit	Helicopter	1985	2
Poland	Mi-2/Hoplite	Helicopter	1984-1985	15
Poland	MT-LB	APC	1983-1990	750
Poland	T-55	Tank	1981-1982	400
Poland	T-72M1	Tank	1982-1990	500
Romania	T-55	Tank	1982-1984	150
Yugoslavia	M-87 Orkan 262mm	Multiple rocket launcher	1988	2
South Africa	G-5 155mm	Towed gun	1985-1988	200
Switzerland	PC-7 Turbo trainer	Trainer aircraft	1980-1983	52
Switzerland	PC-9	Trainer aircraft	1987-1990	20
Switzerland	Roland	APC/IFV	1981	100
United Kingdom	Chieftain/ARV	ARV	1982	29
United Kingdom	Cymbeline	Arty locating radar	1986-1988	10
United States	MD-500MD Defender	Light Helicopter	1983	30
United States	Hughes-300/TH-55	Light Helicopter	1983	30
United States	MD-530F	Light Helicopter	1986	26
United States	Bell 214ST	Helicopter	1988	31
Soviet Union	Il-76M/Candid-B	Strategic airlifter	1978-1984	33
Soviet Union	Mi-24D/Mi-25/Hind-D	Attack helicopter	1978-1984	12
Soviet Union	Mi-8/Mi-17/Hip-H	Transport helicopter	1986-1987	37
Soviet Union	Mi-8TV/Hip-F	Transport helicopter	1984	30
Soviet Union	Mig-21bis/Fishbed-N	Fighter aircraft	1983-1984	61
Soviet Union	Mig-23BN/Flogger-H	FGA aircraft	1984-1985	50
Soviet Union	Mig-25P/Foxbat-A	Interceptor aircraft	1980-1985	55
Soviet Union	Mig-25RB/Foxbat-B	Recon aircraft	1982	8
Soviet Union	Mig-29/Fulcrum-A	Fighter aircraft	1986-1989	41
Soviet Union	Su-22/Fitter-H/J/K	FGA aircraft	1986-1987	61
Soviet Union	Su-25/Frogfoot-A	Ground attack aircraft	1986-1987	84
Soviet Union	2A36 152mm	Towed gun	1986-1988	180
Soviet Union	2S1 122mm	Self-Propelled Howitzer	1980-1989	150
Soviet Union	2S3 152mm	Self-propelled gun	1980-1989	150
Soviet Union	2S4 240mm	Self-propelled mortar	1983	10
Soviet Union	9P117/SS-1 Scud TEL	SSM launcher	1983-1984	10
Soviet Union	BM-21 Grad 122mm	Multiple rocket launcher	1983-1988	560
Soviet Union	D-30 122mm	Towed gun	1982-1988	576
Soviet Union	M-240 240mm	Mortar	1981	25
Soviet Union	M-46 130mm	Towed Gun	1982-1987	576
Soviet Union	9K35 Strela-10/SA-13	AAV(M)	1985	30
Soviet Union	BMD-1	IFV	1981	10
Soviet Union	PT-76	Light tank	1984	200
Soviet Union	SA-9/9P31	AAV(M)	1982-1985	160
Soviet Union	Long Track	Air surv radar	1980-1984	10
Soviet Union	SA-8b/9K33M Osa AK	Mobile SAM system	1982-1985	50
Soviet Union	Thin Skin	Air surv radar	1980-1984	5
Soviet Union	9M111/AT-4 Spigot	Anti-tank missile	1986-1989	3000
Soviet Union	9M37/SA-13 Gopher	SAM	1985-1986	960
Soviet Union	KSR-5/AS-6 Kingfish	Anti-ship missile	1984	36
Soviet Union	Kh-28/AS-9 Kyle	Anti-radar missile	1983-1988	250
Soviet Union	R-13S/AA2S Atoll	SRAAM	1984-1987	1080
Soviet Union	R-17/SS-1c Scud-B	SSM	1982-1988	840
Soviet Union	R-27/AA-10 Alamo	BVRAAM	1986-1989	246
Soviet Union	R-40R/AA-6 Acrid	BVRAAM	1980-1985	660
Soviet Union	R-60/AA-8 Aphid	SRAAM	1986-1989	582
Soviet Union	SA-8b Gecko/9M33M	SAM	1982-1985	1290
Soviet Union	SA-9 Gaskin/9M31	SAM	1982-1985	1920
Soviet Union	Strela-3/SA-14 Gremlin	Portable SAM	1987-1988	500

== Political implications ==
The Soviet Union and her satellites were the main suppliers of arms to Iraq following the 1972 signing of the Soviet-Iraqi Treaty of Friendship and Cooperation. France was another important supplier of weapons to Iraq during the 1970s. The United States, the world's leading arms exporter, did not have normal relations with Iraq from 1967 (due to the Six-Day War) until 1984.

Soviet-Iraqi relations suffered strains in the late 1970s. When Iraq invaded Iran in 1980, the Soviet Union cut off weapons sales to Iraq and did not resume them until 1982. During the war, the People's Republic of China became a major new source of weapons for Iraq, with increasing sales from France, the U.K. and Egypt.

== See also ==
- International aid to combatants in the Iran–Iraq War
- United States support for Iran during the Iran–Iraq war
- Arms trade
- Arms Industry
- Stockholm International Peace Research Institute
