= France–Iraq relations =

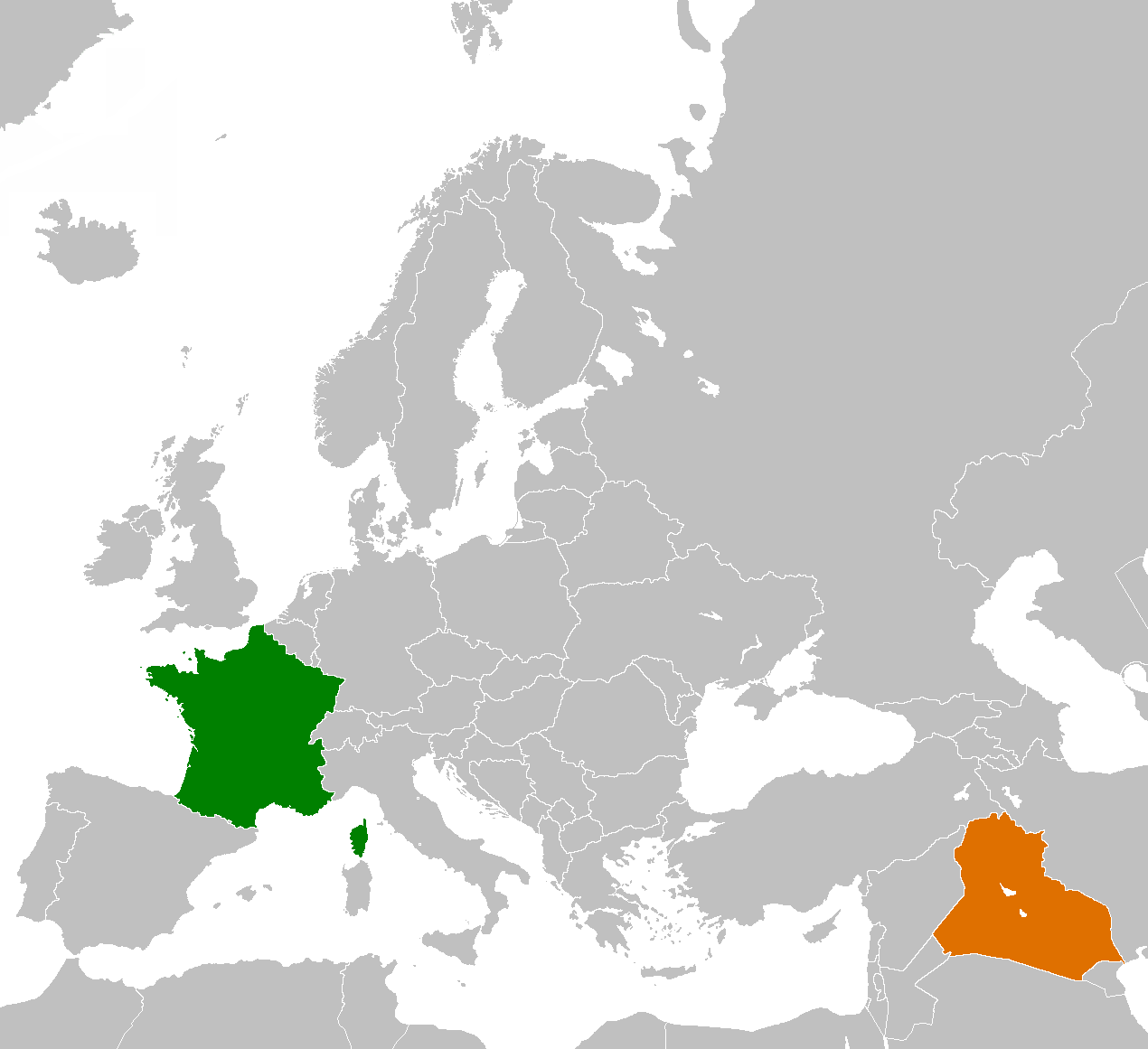
- France: Iraq

French–Iraq relations are the relations between France and Iraq. France played a major role in Iraqi secession from the Ottoman Empire and eventual freedom from British colonial status. The Franco-Iraqi relationship is often defined by conflict and peace, with France supporting Iraq during the Iran-Iraq War, supporting intervention in Iraq in Operation Desert Storm, and opposing the 2003 U.S. Invasion of Iraq. As of 2004, Iraq maintains an embassy in Paris and France maintains an embassy in Baghdad and a consulate general in Erbil.

== History ==
Abbasid–Carolingian alliance

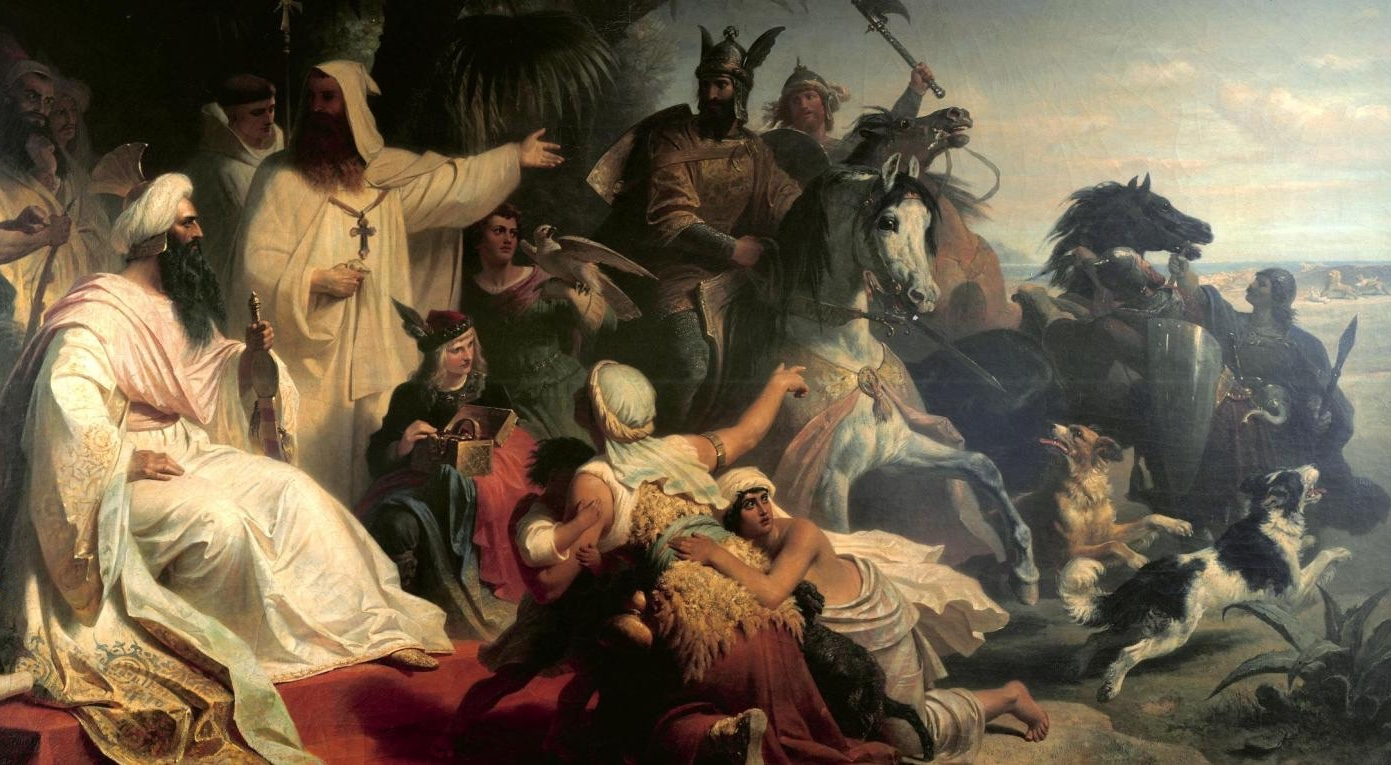
Romantic depiction of Harun receiving a Frankish delegation

=== Pre-Independence Iraq ===
Contemporary Iraqi independence is firmly rooted in the fall of the Ottoman Empire, which the French, British and Russian forces were certain would come about as a result of Triple Entente in the Middle East during World War I. In response to waning Ottoman cohesion following the war and the signing of the Armistice of Mudros, the powers sought and gained mandates of former Ottoman territories through the League of Nations; France was granted Lebanon and Syria and Britain was granted Mesopotamia and Palestine. However, independence movements in Iraq ultimately reduced British influence in the region to allow for a semi-autonomous state. Other mandated areas experienced similar revolts around the same time, namely Syria, which succeeded in a revolt and established the independent Arab Kingdom of Syria. In the war that followed, France deposed the revolt-instated King Faisal I, whom the British government saw as a popular figurehead that was friendly to the British due to prior dealings with the British before World War I. Further, the British believed placing Faisal on the throne would prevent him from returning to fight for his throne in Syria, leading to tension in British-French relations. Ultimately, Iraq was granted full independence as the Kingdom of Iraq in 1932.

=== Kingdom of Iraq ===
Following the independence of Iraq, France maintained formal relations with the Iraqi Kingdom, even the governments coming in result of coup. At the turn of the 1940s, the occupation of France and establishment of Vichy France during World War II forced the French government into exile, as well as another Iraqi coup lead to a pro-German regime that put the two governments in conflict. British military operations eventually reestablished the Hashemite monarchy in Iraq, which served as the Allied hold to attack Vichy territory in Syria, which was aided by Free France. After the defeat of the Axis, both France and Iraq's exiled governments were reinstated and both joined the United Nations. Some years later, the French provided clandestine support against Iraq to Israel during the 1948 Arab-Israeli Conflict; not only allowing Air France to ship arms, but blocking UK-brokered Swiss arms sales to Iraqi allies in the conflict. Later, conflicts with the Egyptian government over union with Syria, British opposing Kuwaiti inclusion into an Arab-Hashemite Federation and growing unrest lead to another coup that deposed the Iraqi monarchy to form an Iraqi Republic.

=== Iraqi Republic ===
The later days of the Iraqi Republic saw a new shift in relations with France with the election of Charles de Gaulle in 1958. From a position of unrest following the Algerian War, de Gaulle sought to re-establish relations with the Arab world. Although France's support of Israel was evident during the Six Day War, de Gaulle found that Algeria was no longer able to be controlled and would need Arab support in the Middle East to retain French status as a global political entity outside that of the United States' or Soviet Union's sphere of influence. This period of warming of relations and increased trade would persist even after the fall of the Iraqi Republic in the 14 July Revolution, the eventual coup ousting the then general Abd al-Karim Qasim in the Ramadan Revolution and the Ba'athist seizure of power in the 17 July Revolution.

=== Ba'athist Iraq ===
After the 17 July Revolution, the Ba'ath Party of Iraq, under then chairman Ahmed Hassan al-Bakr, attempted to consolidate power and fulfill party principles by removing Nasserists and communists from Iraq. This coincided both with the regimes policy against Soviet influence in the party and attempts to woo the Iraqi Communist Party into acceptance of the Ba'ath regime and the National Progressive Front, given the ICP's apprehension after the anti-communist stance of the regime in 1963. Further, France was very willing to continue providing for the regime under these circumstances, especially within their own foreign policy centered around Soviet containment, stemming from Soviet assistance in the liberation of French Indochina and assistance to the North Korean regime during the Korean War, a stance embraced by the United States in the aftermath of World War II that other Western nations followed during the Cold War. This continued improvement of relations established a precedent of French support for the Iraqi state, which established the sale and lending of weapons in 1975, which would include the sale of Mirage F-1 jet fighters, Alouette, Gazelle, Puma and Super Frelon helicopters, a share in the future production of the Mirage 2000, Exocet missiles and the training to use said equipment. Additionally, French reliance on Iraqi oil and trade further cemented these relations, affirmed further by the French Defense Ministry being a controlling stake of French trade and export policy based on France's missile superiority in Europe. This supply of military arms, though not initially intended for use in a conflict, ultimately came to use in the Iran-Iraq War following the Iranian Revolution, which was initially welcomed by the Iraqi government as the ousting of a British instated Shah, but later came to conflict between pan-Islamic Iranian and pan-Arab Iraqi policy. Central Intelligence Agency documents detail that Iraq had been pursuing nuclear weapons as early as 1980, being offered reactors by the Soviets in 1959, with France selling them another two reactors in 1975. However, France's supply of highly enriched uranium came under question when Iraq refused to allow it to be substituted for lower quality uranium insufficient for the development of weapons. An Israeli strike on the Osirak nuclear reactor, which the French had assisted in building, is often referred to as the end of French support for Iraq's nuclear ambitions and Iraqi nuclear capability. However, France also supported Iraqi chemical weapons programs, among other Western states, including the United States, the Netherlands, Australia, Italy and France, as well as countless private companies within these countries. These weapons were used on civilian populations within Iran, but the war ended with a status quo ceasefire in 1988. Facing mounting debts and social upheaval from the failure of the conflict, Iraq began posturing itself against Kuwait. The resulting Iraqi invasion of Kuwait ended in Iraqi occupation of Kuwait, which would in turn result in a coalition response in Operation Desert Storm and the Gulf War, of which France committed 18,000 troops. The French involvement in the operation was internally referred to as Opération Daguet, including trade interdiction, air support and medical leasing. The coalition eventually succeeded in ousting Iraqi forces from Kuwait. Though this conflict had little effect on the relationship between Iraq and France, it did deteriorate already harrowed Iraq-United States relations, including the stationing and use of US and coalition airforce in southern Iraq and the passage of the Iraq Liberation Act, formalizing US foreign policy to oust Saddam Hussein and the Ba'athists from power. This tension would culminate following the passage of several Security Council resolutions that required non-proliferation of Iraq's nonconventional arms following the Gulf War, namely the United Nations Special Commission and International Atomic Energy Agency, which the Iraqi government harassed and obstructed until 1998 when all cooperation was severed citing concerns that Americans embedded within the agencies were feeding intelligence to the United States. Later, these claims would turn out to be true. Following the attacks of September 11th, 2001 in the United States, a series of allegations of Saddam's relationship to Al-Qaeda came to being, which were used as a means of supplementing prior United States policy to remove the Ba'athists from power before the attacks took place. The United States brought a resolution to the UN Security Council with the intent of doing so, which France not only rejecting the resolution and threatening to use their veto powers against the resolution before it was retracted, but refused to contribute to US coalition efforts afterwards.

=== Republic of Iraq ===
In September 2020, French President Emmanuel Macron travelled to Iraq to assert its "sovereignty", despite regional tensions. He met with President Barham Salih, Prime Minister Mustafa Al-Kadhimi and President of the Kurdistan Region Nechirvan Barzani.

In late August 2021, President Macron attended a regional conference in Baghdad, to which several leaders of countries neighboring Iraq have been invited. However, he mentioned that France would keep troops in Iraq as part of anti-terrorism operations in cooperation with the Iraqi government.

== Resident diplomatic missions ==
- France has an embassy in Baghdad and a consulate-general in Erbil.
- Iraq has an embassy in Paris.
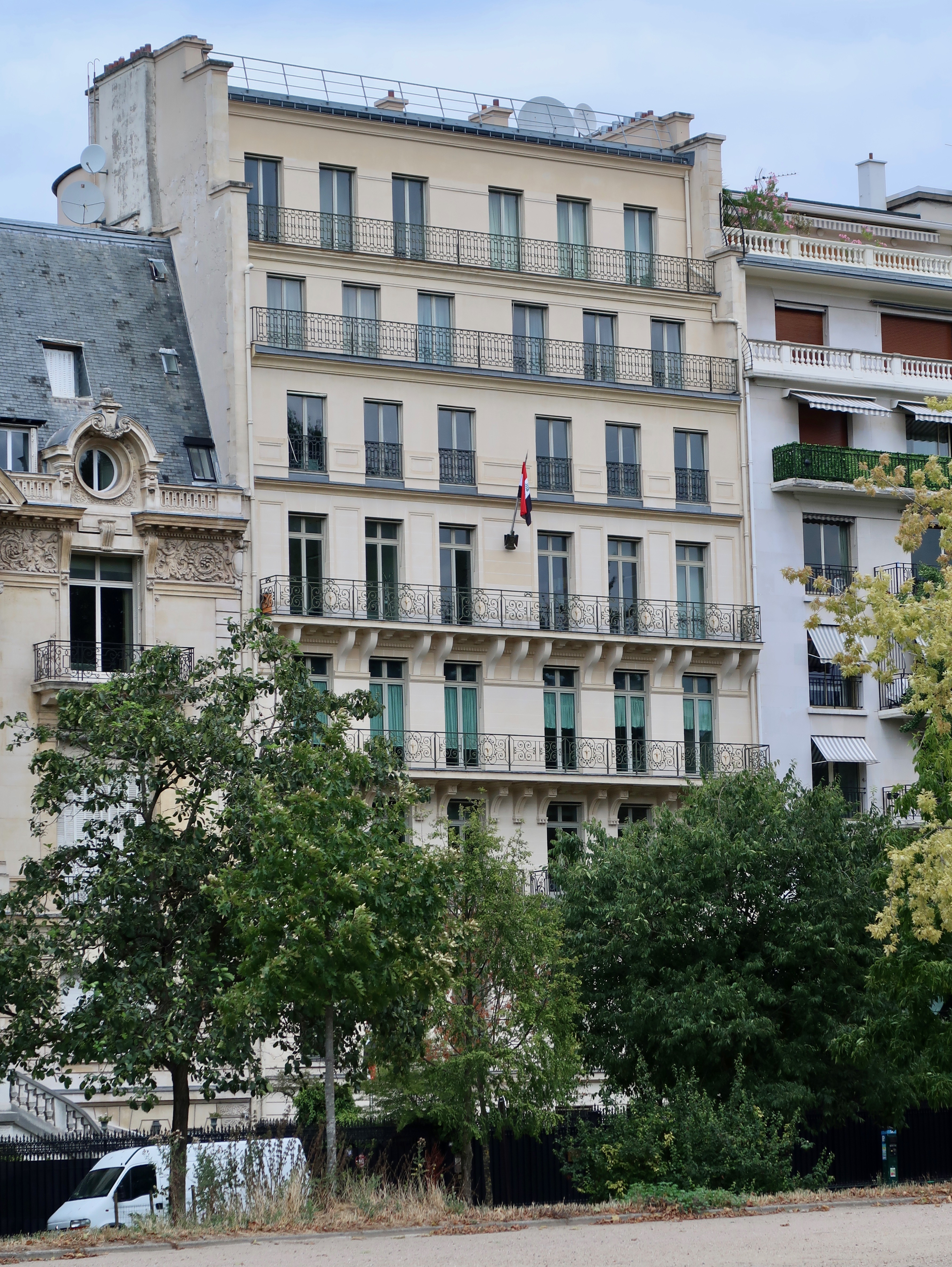
Embassy of Iraq in Paris

== See also ==
- Foreign relations of France
- Foreign relations of Iraq
- French support for Iraq during the Iran–Iraq war
- Iraq–European Union relations
- Operation Opera
- Iraqis in France
