= French support for Iraq during the Iran–Iraq War =

The support by France was an important element to strengthen Iraq for the Iran–Iraq War. Starting in roughly 1975, leading up to the Iran–Iraq War, as well as the war itself, the greatest amount of military equipment came to Iraq from the Soviet Union, but France was probably second, and generally provided higher-technology equipment than the Soviets.

== Motives for policy towards Iraq ==
France was a long-standing commercial partner of Iraq, having taken part in the Turkish Petroleum Company as early as 1924. In the 1970s, Iraq supplied 24 percent of France's oil, and France was still struggling to sell goods, including weapons, to offset its commercial imbalance with such solvent countries. France traditionally had a balanced policy in the Middle East, and wanted to continue those both for general reasons of state, as well as ensuring petroleum supply. More generally, the French have been present in the Middle East for centuries until the 20th century, as witnessed by the Sykes–Picot and San Remo agreements.

From the Iraqi standpoint, it was important to have Western sources of military supply, to avoid becoming too dependent on the Soviet Union. In issues including the Syrian role in Lebanon, the Arab–Israeli conflict, and having a nonaligned movement separate from the Western and Soviet camps, French and Iraqi policy differed. Baathist ideology was fundamentally anti-communist.

Iraq and the Soviet Union did not always have common political goals. Iraq and France, however, also did not always have common interests, but France was quite liberal in not tying arms sales to Iraqi actions, or other instability in the region. For example, France continued to openly trade with Iraq even when Iranian-inspired terrorists took French hostages in Lebanon.

== Export controls ==
Many countries provide a level of policy control, because private exporters need government approval. In some countries, such as France, the government both controls a large segment of the military industry, and also decides on the propriety of export.

Arms exporting is part of the overall policy, originated under Charles de Gaulle, of France having an independent defense policy. French military manufacturing is an economically important sector, providing jobs and foreign exchange.

Since France has a significant commercial as well as military space program, the second largest in NATO, it has an unusual competence in missile technology.

French export controls derive from two administrative decrees from the time of the Second World War, in which the government has exclusive control of importing and exporting military goods. At the time of the Iran–Iraq War, the Missile Technology Control Regime was not created yet (1987). The key export control decision making is in a Cabinet-level committee made up of representatives from the Ministries of Foreign Affairs, Defense, Industry, Finance, and Foreign Trade. Actual administration of licensing and enforcement is under the Customs and Excise Department of the Ministry of Finance.

The Defense Ministry is the key controlling organization—specifically the Director of International Relations at the Délégation Générale des Armements (DGA). The DGA has a tradition of being a champion of French exports, for economic and foreign policy reasons.

== Military training and advice ==
Iraq may have had some French and Jordanian military advisors in the defense to the Iranian attack, Operation Beit ol-Moqaddas. The advisors were most effective with the regular troops rather than volunteers.

Iraqi Mirage F-1 ground attack pilots were trained by France. According to the U.S., "tactical changes accompanied the upgrading of equipment. On bombing missions the Iraqis started to use low-altitude attacks. Precision-guided munitions such as laser-guided bombs were used with increased accuracy."

== Air warfare ==
France had sold arms to Iraq during the 1966 to 1968 regime of Abd ar Rahman Arif, but increased its sales between 1974 and 1980. Purchases were generally high technology, including aircraft and missiles.

Iraqi air warfare doctrine was closer to French than Soviet. The Iraqis considered ground attack their most important air warfare mission, and put their best pilots into their Mirages, as opposed to their Soviet air superiority aircraft such as the MiG-25 and MiG-29.

=== Aircraft ===
France sold first-line Mirage F1 fighter-bombers to Iraq, as well as providing Super Etendard attack aircraft while the Mirage orders were being completed.

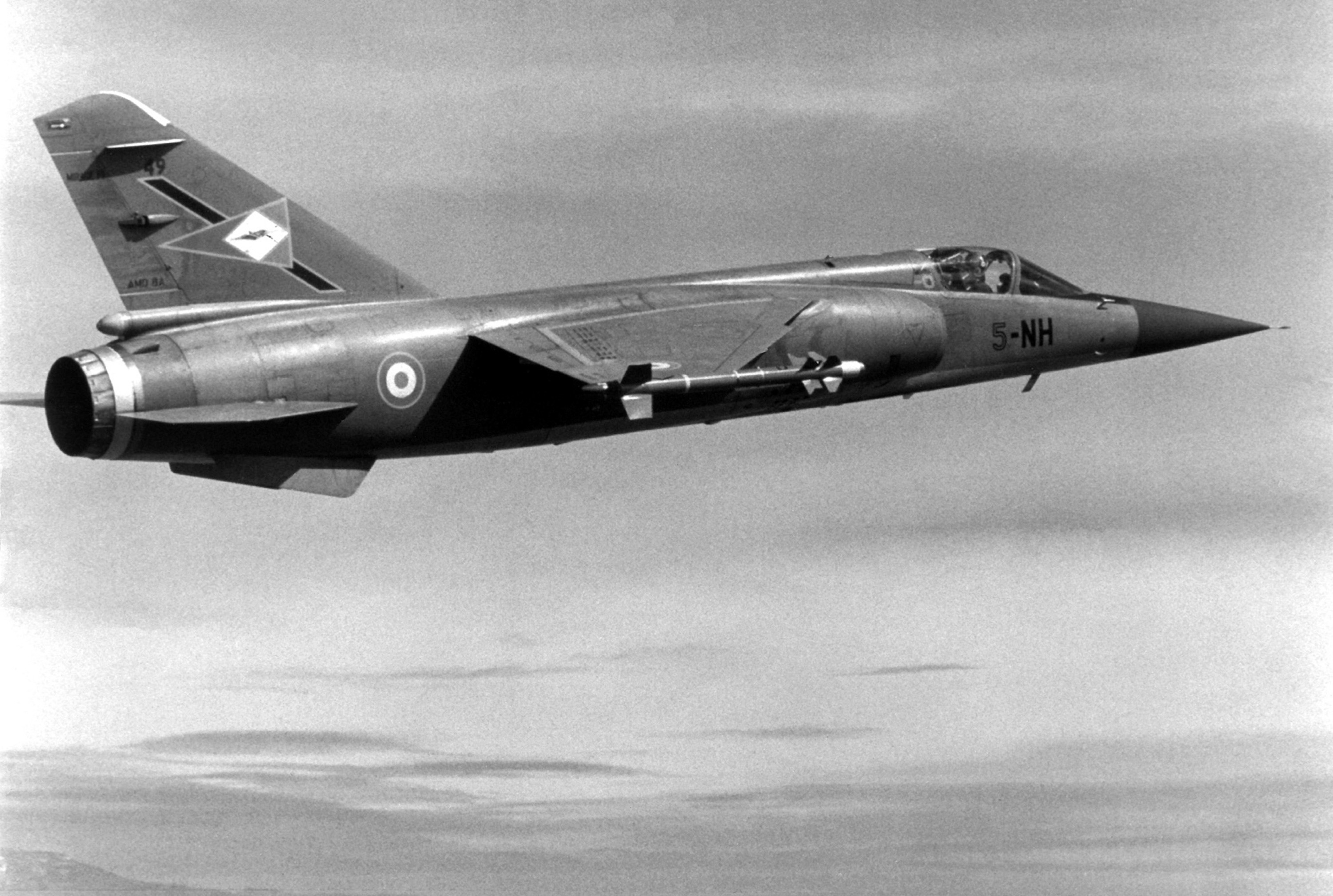
Mirage F1 in French Air Force livery

==== Mirage F1 ====
"Between 1977 and 1987, Paris contracted to sell a total of 133 Mirage F-1 fighters to Iraq." Sources differ as to when Iraq received the first F1s; the Library of Congress said 1978 while the New York Times reported 1981.

According to the Library of Congress, France provided, in 1978, eighteen Mirage F1 interceptors and thirty helicopters, and even agreed to an Iraqi share in the production of the Mirage 2000 in a 2 billion dollar arms deal. The Times said the first of the batch of Mirages were seen in Cyprus, where they were met by pilots arriving in a transport with Jordanian markings.

In 1983, another twenty-nine Mirage F1s were exported to Baghdad. The final batch of twenty-nine aircraft was ordered in September 1985, with a pricetag of over 500 million dollars, part of which was paid in crude oil.

==== Super Etendard ====
France "loaned" Iraq five Super Etendard attack aircraft, equipped with Exocet AM39 air-launched anti-ship missiles, from its own naval inventory. These aircraft were used extensively in the Tanker War before being replaced by 29 F1s (24 F1s following other sources). The French foreign minister made light of the Super Etendard shipment, with a comment of "Five planes, more or less. What does that change?" It certainly changed something in the eye of the Iranians, who apparently were responsible for the Drakkar building terrorist attack, which killed 58 French soldiers.

Support for Iraq is consistent with French policy and a resumption of Iraqi exports may enable Iraq to repay its debt to France. It is worth noting that Argentina, during the Falklands War, used Super Etendards to deliver its five air-launched Exocet missiles, sinking two British ships.

==== Helicopter ====
France sold Alouette, Gazelle, Puma, and Super Frelon helicopters to Iraq.

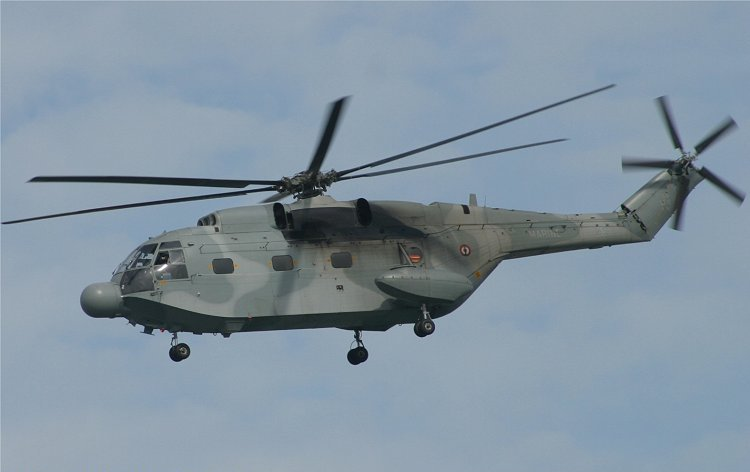
Super Frelon heavy helicopter

Super Frelon helicopters were the SA 321H version, with a search radar and two Exocet antiship missiles.

Alouette and Puma, respectively were light and medium utility helicopters. Gazelles were primarily used in an antitank role, firing the French HOT antitank missile.

Both sides, in the Iran–Iraq War, used helicopters for close air support, reserving their fixed-wing attack aircraft for more distant air strikes. While the helicopters had little air cover in the desert, they learned to use cover near cities and in mountainous terrain.

=== Munitions ===
French weapons sold to Iraq, in general, tended to be higher technology and more complex than the Soviet weapons bought by Iraq. The training in their use was considerably different, as the French weapons usually required more decision making by the pilots, while the use of Soviet air-to-air weapons tended to be at the orders of a ground controller.

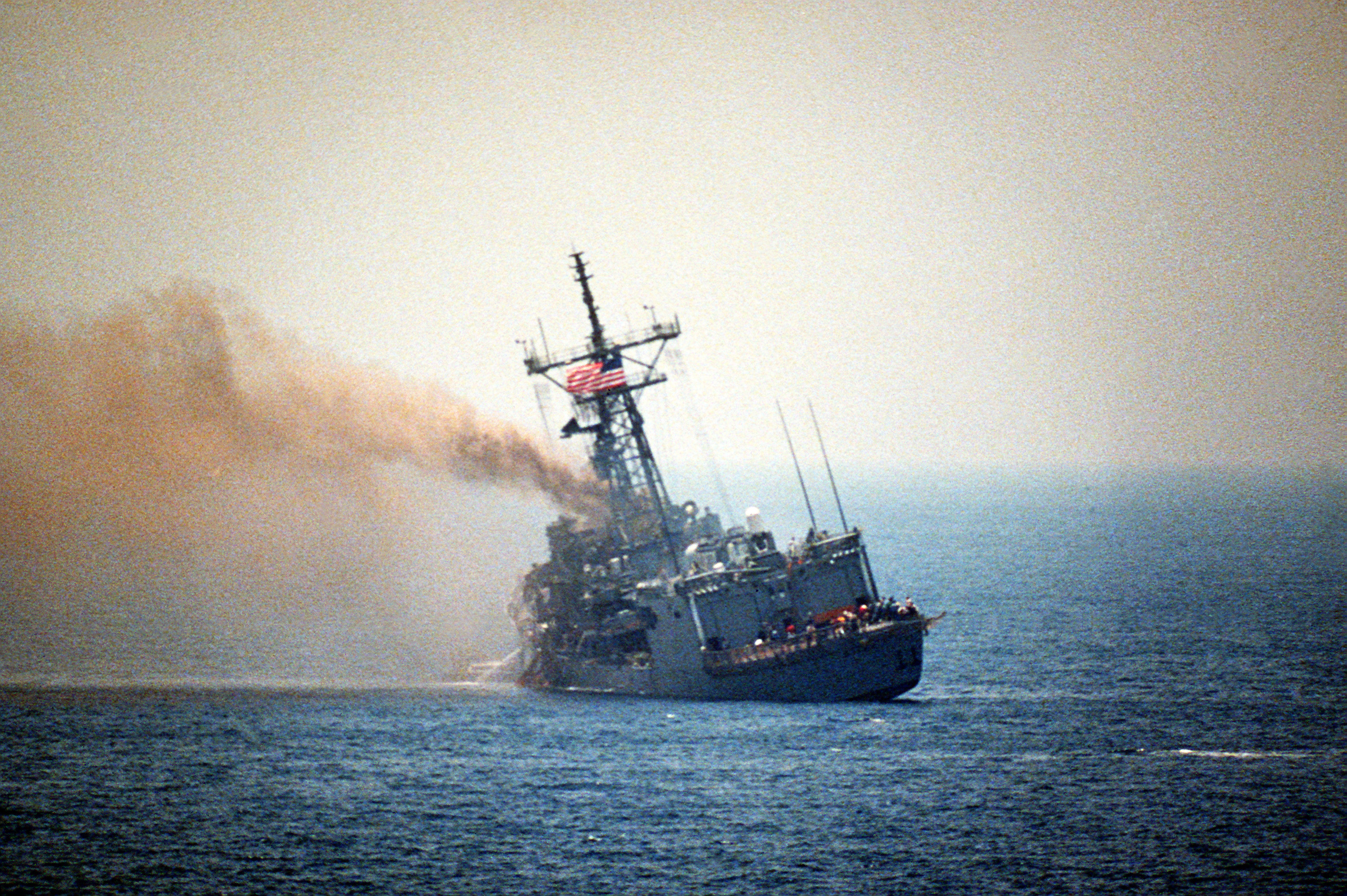
USS Stark listing and burning after being hit by two Exocets; her crew saved her but lost 37 dead.

==== Exocet anti-shipping missile ====
Iraq also bought more than 400 Exocet AM39 anti-shipping missiles. This is the weapon that struck the USS Stark, and for which the U.S. did not retaliate against Iraq.

==== AS30 air-to-ground missile ====
France sold Iraq at least 200 AS-30 laser-guided missiles between 1983 and 1986.

==== HOT antitank missile ====
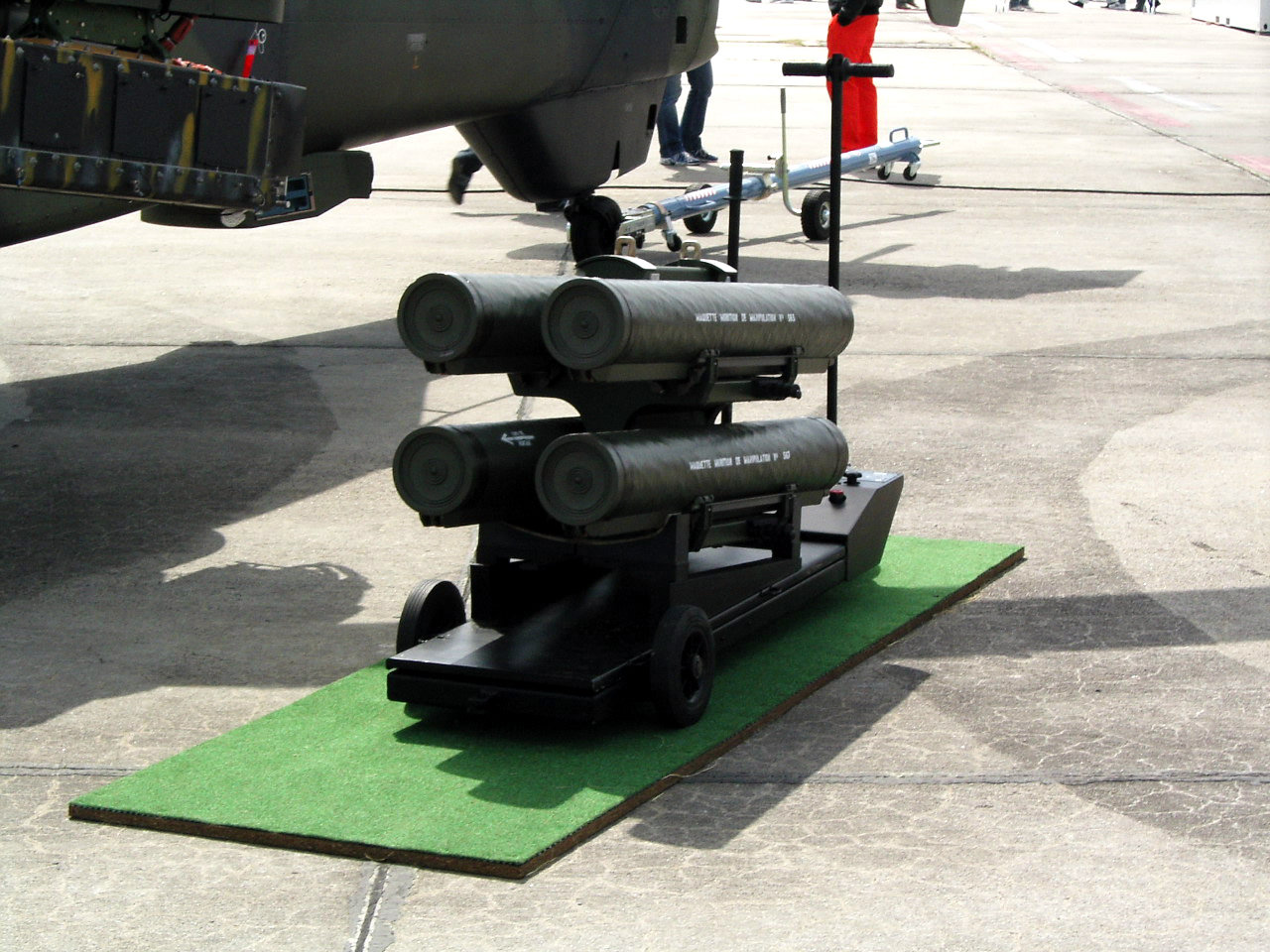
HOT-3 antitank missile on a German helicopter

The Euromissile HOT can be helicopter- or vehicle-launched. Comparable to the U.S. TOW, it is wire-guided and optically tracked.

==== Armat ====
Iraq bought the French ARMAT anti-radiation missile, a variant of the Martel anti-shipping missile. The ARMAT has a different niche than other ARMs such as the British ALARM missile and U.S. HARM. It has an especially large warhead, intended principally to destroy early warning and ground control radars, as opposed to being a defensive ARM intended to suppress air defenses deployed against aircraft penetrating them to strike other targets.

== Air defense ==
In 1981, Iraq bought 30 French Crotale surface-to-air missile fire units from France and updated to up 60 Roland fire units by the end of the war. Nevertheless, Iraq seemed unable to use these French missiles, or its capable Soviet SA-6 missiles, on more than an individual basis.

== Land warfare ==
Reproduced in the U.S. Congressional Record, a CBS News interview with arms dealer Sarkis Soghanalian gave details of his dealings with Iraq before, during, and after the Iran-Iraq War. Kroft. Sarkis says the equipment he sold to Iraq has been customized to withstand the heat and sand and dust of the Middle East. In particular, he sold French 155 mm self-propelled howitzers to Iraq. He said its range was greater than the U.S. equivalent, and perhaps more reliable because it was simpler, having no electronics or air conditioning to break down.

== Weapons of mass destruction ==
=== Nuclear ===
==== CERBAG ====
An agreement to build a nuclear facility was signed with France on 17 November 1975. France was to supply two Osirak reactors, each fueled with highly enriched uranium. The project was conducted by a French consortium called CERBAG (Centre d'études et recherche Baghdad lit. Baghdad Study & Research Center), with the member companies Technicatome, Société Générale pour les Techniques Nouvelles, Comsip Enterprise, Constructions Navales et Industrielles de la Méditerranée, and Bouygues Offshores.

When France became concerned about Iraqi diversion of bomb-grade material, the French tried to convince the Iraqis to accept a much less enriched form of uranium. Iraq refused, so the French shipped the first reactor core in June 1980.

The CIA judged that France (and Italy) were unlikely to default on contracts, as they wanted to keep the good will of a major oil supplier. Iraq's leverage, however, was assessed as having less oil capability as a result of the Iran-Iraq War.

==== Maraging steel ====
Maraging steel is a high-strength material that, in "Grade 350", is used in uranium enrichment centrifuges. Iraq obtained between 100 and 106 tons of this normally export-controlled substance, through a complex series of transactions, middlemen, and front companies.

The transaction started with a French businessman. In 1988, Adel Ali Ridha, an official of the Iraqi gas centrifuge, met a French dealer of the company 3F at the Saddam Establishment, a military manufacturing facility. It was making gas centrifuge components with assistance H+H Metalforming, a German company half-owned by Iraq.

The 3F representative probably was unaware of Adel's employer, and told him that his company made the needed grade of maraging steel. Approximately a month later, the salesman returned to Baghdad, told Adel there were problems in getting a French export license, but volunteered to help find a supplier.

On his next visit, the Frenchman brought maraging steel samples, but he would not disclose the supplier. Iraq with the assistance of H+H Metalform analyzed the samples and established the specifications needed for Iraq's centrifuges. After providing the results to the Frenchman, he returned with new samples, which met the Iraqi standards. The material passed Iraqi tests, and the French representative brought in a Pakistani middleman, in October 1988 with Muzhar Malik, who was based in Britain. Malik contracted with Eurocom Incorporated of Saudi Arabia, which he obtained from an Austrian firm Boehler Edelstahl. Maraging steel was not export-controlled by Austria.

The steel was shipped to Dubai and then to Iraq. Payment came from a Jersey Islands bank and from BCCI in the US.

=== Chemical weapons ===
Citing a "left-of-center" French magazine, Le Nouvel Observateur, as the primary source, but also quoting French officials, the New York Times reported France had been sending chemical precursors of chemical weapons to Iraq, since 1986. The report cited a company called Protec S.A. was the key exporter for a group of French companies. President François Mitterrand was reported to have said he "knew of French companies that were breaking the United Nations embargo against Iraq. Mr. Mitterrand vowed to prosecute violators vigorously." An unnamed French official indicated that U.S. satellite photography was critical in determining the ultimate destination of the materials, but the photographs made available suggested that "much of the material" may have gone to a chemical weapons factory in Samarra. The chemicals, listed in Schedule 3 of the Chemical Weapons Convention, are considered to have legitimate dual-use applications, but are also known precursors of nerve agents.

It also mentioned Protec was allied to a German company, Karl Kolb, whose CEO was being held in jail by German authorities, during an investigation of illegal shipments. They worked with a third German company to ship manufacturing equipment to Iraq.

== See also ==
- International aid to combatants in the Iran–Iraq War
- France-Iraq relations
- Osirak
- Iraq and the European Union
