= International aid to combatants in the Iran–Iraq War =

During the Iran–Iraq War, both Iran and Iraq received large quantities of weapons from foreign powers. In some cases, a country supplied both Iraq and Iran.

== Iran ==
=== Military support ===
Support for the new Iranian government was divided. Following the Iranian Revolution, as many as 14,000 military commanders and officers were imprisoned, executed, purged or discharged under charges of being loyal to the deposed Shah and treason for a failed coup to topple the Islamic Republic. Numerous oppositions groups revelled against the clerical rule in Iran, such as the People's Mujahedin of Iran, as well as other leftists groups. There were also state-sponsored executions throughout Iran, and many trained engineers either fled the country or were forced to serve in their hometown, which had no use for their expertise. This had massively weakened Iran's army, leaving it incapable of protecting Iran's borders. Around this time, Iraq's leader, Saddam Hussein, decided was the perfect opportunity to launch an all-out invasion against Iran. Iran, in response, created a new military branch called the IRGC, which was initially tasked with fighting and shutting off numerous separatist groups formed and armed around Iran. Following the Iraqi invasion, the IRGC then expanded its field of operations to fighting Saddam's forces. The army, which was equipped with Western weaponry, was not prepared to defend Iran and so much of Iran's Western ammunition and heavy equipment were left unusable as the army was recovering. So the IRGC, tasked its first member, Mohsen Rafighdoost, with purchasing arms from the Eastern Bloc. Rafighdoost contacted and established positive ties with many countries including Syria (under Hafez al-Assad), Libya (under Gaddafi), North Korea (under Kim Il Sung), Bulgaria (under Todor Zhivkov), Poland, Yugoslavia, East Germany, China (under Deng Xiaoping) and eventually the Western Bloc (after Switzerland who indirectly sold Iran western ammunition, Argentina also reached out to Iran proposing arms sales and agreed to also train Iranians in TOW production) to purchase arms for the IRGC. Iran's recovering army, however, had its own logistics support who reached out to Western Bloc countries including the United States and, indirectly, Israel to purchase ammunition and spare parts for their Western-made military equipment. Syria, Libya (who supplied Iran with approximately US$900 million of free arms and 30 Scud-B missiles and North Korea (who later supplied Iran with between 200 and 300 Soviet-built Scud-B and Scud-C missiles and transferred missile production technology to Iran) were the first suppliers of arms to Iran. Eastern Bloc followed suit under financial pressures as the Soviet Union no longer had strict policies on sanctioning Iran. Rafighdoost maintains that the equipment Iran received from the United States following the Iran-Contra affair, were non-functional and broken, and were only made usable after repairs. He was also contacted by a third-party with ties to Switzerland who agreed to provide Iran with Western-made ammunition. Rafighdoost also claims that he was approached by an Israeli arms dealer in his hotel room while he was in Switzerland, and he rejected him.

Iran was also backed by the Kurdish parties of KDP, and PUK, also the Islamist Kurdish Mujahideen in North Iraq, all organizations in fact rebelling against Iraqi Ba'athist government with Iranian support.

=== Logistic support ===
Iran's foreign supporters gradually came to include Syria, and Libya. The United States also provided covert support for Iran through Israel, although it is debated as to whether U.S. President Ronald Reagan ordered the sale of weapons to Iran. Most of this support included TOW missiles.

== Iraq ==
=== Logistic support ===
Iraq's army was primarily equipped with weaponry it had previously purchased from the Soviet Union and its satellites in the preceding decade. During the war, it also purchased billions of dollars' worth of advanced equipment from France, China, Egypt, Germany and other sources. Iraq's three main suppliers of weaponry during the war were the Soviet Union followed by China and then France.

The United States sold Iraq over $200 million in helicopters, which were used by the Iraqi military in the war. These were the only direct U.S.-Iraqi military sales. At the same time, the U.S. provided substantial covert support for Saddam Hussein. The CIA directed non-U.S. origin hardware to Saddam Hussein's armed forces "to ensure that Iraq had sufficient military weapons, ammunition and vehicles to avoid losing the Iran-Iraq war." Also, "dual use" technology was transferred from the U.S. to Iraq.

West Germany and United Kingdom also provided dual use technology that allowed Iraq to expand its missile program and radar defences.

According to an uncensored copy of Iraq's 11,000-page declaration to the U.N., leaked to Die Tageszeitung and reported by The Independent, the know-how and material for developing unconventional weapons were obtained from 150 foreign companies, from countries such as West Germany, the U.S., France, UK and China.

Iraq's main financial backers were the oil-rich Persian Gulf states, most notably Saudi Arabia ($30.9 billion), Kuwait ($8.2 billion) and the United Arab Emirates ($8 billion).

The Iraqgate scandal revealed that branch of Italy's largest bank, Banca Nazionale del Lavoro, in Atlanta, US, relying largely on U.S. taxpayer-guaranteed loans, funneled $5 billion to Iraq from 1985 to 1989.

=== Military support ===
Sudan sent as many as 7 brigades, or more than 50,000 troops to fight under Iraqi command. Additionally, more than 20,000 volunteers from Arab nations joined Iraq's defence during this period.

== Countries which supported either combatant ==
Country	Support to Iraq	Support to Iran
Albania		Limited political support.
Argentina		Sales of uranium, shells for 155mm artillery, rockets, radio equipments, 7,62mm ammunition, anti-tank rockets.
Austria	Construction of munition plant. Sold 200 self-propelled 155mm artillery pieces.	Sold 140 GHN-45 Howitzers along with significant stocks of ammunition. Communications equipment.
Belgium	Construction of airfields and delivery of various munitions.	Sold jet engines for F-4 Phantom aircraft. Delivered artillery shells and other munitions.
Brazil	Sale of ammunition, armoured cars, and tactical multiple rocket launcher.	Major supplier (Sold 500 Cascavel and Urutu armored vehicles).
Canada	Sales of war material.	
China	Some financial support and military exports.	Sale of military equipment, including fighter aircraft, surface-to-air missiles, rocket launchers, tanks, and artillery.
Denmark	Sales of military equipment.	
Egypt	Military exports.	
Ethiopia		Sold 12 F-5 Tiger IIs.
France	Sale of high-tech military equipment and uranium.	Covert sales of large quantities of artillery shells (delivered 500,000 155mm and 203mm shells) Delivery of 60 pieces of 106mm recoilless rifles.
East Germany	Sale of chemical weapons and high-tech military equipment.	Sales of spare parts for Soviet-made military equipment taken from Iraqi troops.
West Germany	Sale of chemical weapons and high-tech military equipment. $600 million worth of Electronic countermeasure systems. 1500 trucks and spare parts depot. 300 tank recovery and construction vehicles.	Chemical warfare defense equipment Communications equipment, small arms, and munitions.
Greece		$119 million worth of armaments and munitions.
Hungary	Sales of war materiel.	
India	Trained more than 120 Iraqi MiG-21 pilots, provided technical assistance to Iraqi Air Force through a tripartite agreement involving France.	
Israel		Clandestine support.
Italy	Several billion dollars in funding; sale of land and sea mines as well as uranium.	Sale of land and sea mines.
Japan	Engineering equipment such as trucks, caterpillars and bulldozers, etc.	Engineering equipment such as trucks, loaders, backhoes, bulldozers, etc. and light trucks and SUVs.
Jordan	Acted as main supply line.	
North Korea		During the North Korean support for Iran during the Iran–Iraq war, it sold domestically-produced arms; acted as an intermediate for covert sales by the Soviet Union, Soviet satellites, and China.
South Korea	Sold $425 million worth of ammunition, millions of Bangtan Helmet, and other quartermaster supplies.	Sold communication equipment, ammunition, F-4 Phantom II parts, KH179 155 mm towed howitzer, 14,200 K111 Jeep series, and other heavy weapons.
Kuwait	Financial support and conduit for arms sales.	
Libya		Armaments, munitions and ballistic missiles.
Netherlands	Optical equipment, including night vision devices for ground forces.	Sales of Chemical Warfare defense equipment.
Norway	Fire and rescue vehicles.	Fire and rescue vehicles.
Pakistan		Sold shoulder-launched surface-to-air missile; unaccountable and covert financial support for Iran by Pakistan.
Poland	Sales of military materiel.	
Portugal	Sale of uranium and arms.	Sale of ammunition and explosives.
Qatar	Initial support, though not openly.	
Romania	Sales of military materiel.	
Saudi Arabia	$20 billion in funding.	
Singapore	Provided chemical warfare precursors; acted as a transshipment point for weapons; was manufacturing site of foreign-designed weapons.	
Somalia	Limited arms sales.	
South Africa	Sale of military armament (200 G5 155mm Artillery systems).	30 G5 155mm Artillery systems.
Soviet Union	Military equipment and advisors.	Covert military equipment sales.
Spain	Sale of conventional and chemical weapons, especially ammunition and explosives.	Sale of weapons, especially ammunition and explosives. Delivered 200 106mm recoilless rifles.
Sudan	Sent a small contingent of troops to fight alongside Iraqi troops.	
Sweden		Covert sales of RBS-70 surface-to-air missile system, facilities/equipment/explosives/materiel for local weapons manufacturing, and fast-attack boats.
Switzerland	Sales of war materiel and Sales of chemical warfare equipment, also delivered 30 Bravo and Pilatus trainer aircraft.	Chemical Warfare defense equipment Delivered 15 PC-6 propeller utility aircraft and 47 PC-7 propeller training aircraft, as well as Cryptology equipment, large quantities of ammunition, and electronic components for radars.
Syria		Armaments, munitions and ballistic missiles.
Turkey		Sold armaments.
United Arab Emirates	Financial aid.	
United Kingdom	Weapons-related equipment and 'sodium cyanide for chemical weapons and plutonium and gas spectrometers'.	Sales of Chemical Warfare defense equipment. Chieftain tank engines and artillery shells.
United States	Several billion dollars worth of economic aid; the sale of dual-use technology and non-U.S. origin weaponry; military intelligence; Special Operations training.	Secret arms sales (Iran-Contra affair).
Vietnam		Sold American-produced arms and equipment captured from South Vietnam.
North Yemen	Political support and volunteers.	
South Yemen		Financial and military support.
Yugoslavia	Weapons sales (more than $2 billion worth), construction of five large airbases with hardened underground aircraft shelters by the Yugoslav construction company Energoprojekt.	

== See also ==
- Iraq–Russia relations
- Iraq–United States relations
- Portugal and the Iran–Iraq War
- Israel in the Iran–Iraq War
- North Korean support for Iran during the Iran–Iraq War
- Italian support for Iraq during the Iran–Iraq war
- French support for Iraq during the Iran–Iraq War
- United States support for Iraq during the Iran–Iraq War
- Soviet Union during the Iran-Iraq War
- Singapore support for Iraq during the Iran–Iraq war
