= Portugal and the Iran–Iraq War =

Portuguese involvement in the Iran–Iraq War

Portugal's involvement in the Iran–Iraq War includes Portugal supplying both Iran and Iraq with arms, and playing a role in the Iran–Contra affair. From 1981 to 1986, 75% of Portuguese arms exports (35.7bn escudos' worth) went to the Middle East; most of it, directly or indirectly, to Iran or Iraq.

== History ==
On 12 November 1980, a joint Defense and Foreign Ministry declaration, joining the United States' embargo, declared that Portugal would not sell or ship weapons to Iran. On 4 December 1980 the 1980 Camarate air crash saw a small private aircraft carrying Portuguese Prime Minister Francisco de Sá Carneiro and Defense Minister Adelino Amaro da Costa crash in Camarate, Lisbon. Initial investigations concluded the incident was an accident, but later parliamentary investigations found evidence of a bomb beneath the cockpit. In 2004, the VIIIth parliamentary inquiry into the affair, headed by Nuno Melo concluded in its unanimous final report that the incident had been caused by an explosive device on the aircraft. Melo told the Xth enquiry in 2013 to investigate the role of arms sales to Iran and the Army's "Fundo de Defesa do Ultramar" slush fund, saying that da Costa had asked the Army about arms sales to Iran on 2 December 1980, and that on 5 December, the day after his death, the Army had issued an order illegally declaring arms sales to be under its jurisdiction, not the Defence Minister's.

Portugal became a major arms supplier to Iraq, selling 3.5bn escudos' worth in 1982 and 6bn in 1983. With Iraq's increasing difficulties keeping up payments for Portuguese arms, on 29 September 1983, the Portuguese government of Mário Soares secretly authorised sales to Iran. Several months later, Portugal's President Ramalho Eanes expressed surprise at learning at the presence at Lisbon Airport of an Iranian aircraft carrying arms. Security arrangements for an Iran Air jumbo jet were such that Iraqi diplomats in Lisbon learned of them. In 1984, Portugal sold Iran 1.5bn escudos' worth of arms, making it Portugal's second-largest customer after Iraq.

=== Iran–Contra ===
In January 1987, the Portuguese Expresso revealed that from 1984 to 1986, $8.3m of Portuguese arms had been supplied to the Nicaraguan Contras by US officials involved in Iran–Contra. The arms amounted to 1,900 tons, arms and ammunition, including 1,500 tons shipped in 1985. Sales were arranged by the Lisbon-based Defex Portugal, an importer/exporter of arms, which showed the Portuguese government end-user certificates certifying supply to Guatemala. Expresso said that Portugal had also been a transit point for Israeli and Eastern Bloc weapons destined for the Contras, identifying 15 flights of arms from Israel going through Lisbon airport.

In November 1985, an attempt to ship Israeli-sourced HAWK missiles to Iran via Portugal failed after the aircraft carrying them took off without having obtained landing rights there and was forced to turn back. Also in January 1987, the New York Times said that "A senior administration official said recently that Portugal had been serving as a primary transshipment point for arms to the contras."

== See also ==
- Silent Majority
- 1980 Camarate air crash
- International aid to combatants in the Iran–Iraq War
