= Elviemek =

Greek explosives manufacturer

Elviemek is a major Greek producer of explosives, founded in 1960. The company has been known internationally, mainly for its grenades and mines.

In 1995 it was acquired by the Econ group of companies, a Greek conglomerate founded in 1950 and specializing in high-tech products such as electronics, optics, sensors and defence equipment. By 1999 the company was in financial ruin following the collapse of the Econ group, and was acquired by Ellinobalkaniki. By 2005 it had diversified into real estate management, technically retaining its explosives division (although production had stopped), but a number of loss-making ventures led to new economic troubles for the company.
