= ARMAT =

- Type: anti-radar missile
- Place of origin: France

Service history
- Used by: France; Egypt; Kuwait; Iraq

Specifications
- Mass: 550 kg (1,210 lb)
- Length: 4.15 m (13 ft 7 in)
- Diameter: 0.40 m (16 in) (body)
- Wingspan: 1.20 m (3 ft 11 in)
- Warhead: 160 kg (350 lb) Semi-Armour Piercing HE
- Engine: solid fuel rocket
- Operational range: 40–120 km (25–75 mi)
- Maximum speed: Mach 0.9 (supersonic in dive)
- Guidance system: Passive radar homing
- Launch platform: Aircraft

ARMAT is a French anti-radar missile. It is a development of the Anglo-French Martel. It was adopted by the French Air Force and exported to several other countries, and has been used in combat by Iraq.

== Development ==
Martel was developed as a joint Anglo-French programme in two versions, a TV-guided version, which was only used by the British, and an anti-radar version, which was used by both countries When it came to replace Martel, Britain and France pursued separate programmes, with British Aerospace developing the Sea Eagle anti-ship missile (which used a similar airframe to Martel but powered by a turbojet and with active radar homing and the smaller ALARM anti-radar missile. To meet France's requirements for an anti-radar missile, French company Matra developed the Martel into the ARMAT (Anti-Radar Matra), with work beginning in 1979. This used the same airframe as the Martel, but with a higher impulse rocket motor, and an improved homing seeker and electronics.

ARMAT is reported to be provided with several interchangeable homing heads, covering differing frequency ranges (from L- to X band) depending on the likely targets, and can be launched from both high or low altitude, with a range of from 40 km (25 mi; 22 nmi) to 120 km (75 mi; 65 nmi) reported. The missile has a high subsonic speed, and is supersonic in a dive. It carries a warhead of 150 kg (330 lb) to 160 kg (350 lb).

== Operational history ==
Iraq took an early interest in the development of ARMAT, and used the missile during the Iran–Iraq War, entering Iraqi service in 1982. ARMAT entered service with the French Air Force in 1984.

ARMAT has been cleared for carriage on the Mirage F.1, Mirage 2000, SEPECAT Jaguar fighters and attack aircraft and the Bréguet 1150 Atlantic maritime patrol aircraft. In 1988, an improved version, called MARS, was proposed. French ARMATs may have been upgraded in the early 1990s.

== Notes ==
- Friedman, Norman (1997). The Naval Institute Guide to World Naval Weapons Systems 1997–98. Annapolis, Maryland, US: Naval Institute Press. ISBN 1-55750-268-4.
- de Guillebon, Hugues (February 2017). "Les programmes secrets avec l'Irak, 1977–1984: Le "Bazar" de Bagdad: Première partie". Le Fana de l'Aviation (in French). No. 567. pp. 16–31. ISSN 0757-4169.
- de Guillebon, Hugues (April 2017). "Les programmes secrets avec l'Irak, 1977–1984: Le "Bazar" de Bagdad: Troisième partie et fin". Le Fana de l'Aviation (in French). No. 569. pp. 58–75. ISSN 0757-4169.
- Hewson, Robert, ed. (2003). Jane's Air-Launched Weapons. Coulsdon, UK: Jane's Information Group. ISBN 0-7106-0866-7.
- Pretty, Ronald T, ed. (1983). Jane's Weapon Systems 1983–84. London: Jane's Yearbooks. ISBN 0-7106-0776-8.
- Richardson, Doug (1 October 1988). "World Missile Directory". Flight International. pp. 33–71. Archived from the original on 5 March 2016.
