= FBC Media =

FBC Media Limited (initials for FactBased Communications) is a media and public relations company based in London currently under administration. It specializes in television content creation, production and distribution and global communication campaigns on behalf of governments, non-governmental organizations and other companies. FBC was incorporated in 1998 and had offices in London, Mumbai and Rome. Among its key figures were its founder and chairman, Alan Friedman, and president John Defterios, currently a presenter on CNN.

FBC produced World Business on CNBC which won a Grand Prix Award in Europe for best global business and financial program. It also produced One Square Mile and Develop or Die, which featured reports from developing nations, on BBC World News.

Clients of FBC Media included Viktor Yanukovych, the former president of Ukraine, who reportedly hired FBC to work with Paul Manafort to provide negative coverage of Yanukovych's political opponent Yulia Tymoshenko.

== Scandal ==
In August 2011, the Sarawak Report blog, named after the state in Malaysia, reported that FBC Media was doubling as a public relations firm for Malaysian politicians. It suggested that the company carried puff pieces about Sarawak Chief Minister Abdul Taib Mahmud in shows that it produced. Sarawak Report is edited by Clare Rewcastle Brown who alleges that Taib and his family have profited from logging Sarawak's rainforests. Malaysian budget records showed FBC received RM58 million to conduct a "Global Strategic Communications Campaign" for the government of Malaysia. The Malaysian government paid out a further RM42 million to FBC in 2010. Between 2009 and 2011, FBC-produced programmes One Square Mile and Develop or Die featured reports from Sarawak criticising environmentalists who oppose logging and palm oil plantations in the state.

An investigation by The Independent further revealed that Microsoft had contracted FBC to provide similar media coverage. Sarawak Report also claimed that the government of Kazakhstan benefited from FBC's services when Prime Minister Karim Massimov was interviewed by John Defterios on CNN during the World Economic Forum in January 2011.

=== Response by media companies ===
In light of the allegations, CNBC cancelled World Business. The BBC suspended all programming made by FBC due to suspicions of conflict of interest and began an investigation into the matter. Sarawak Report also targeted CNN for criticism, claiming that Defterios used his platform on the network to give sympathetic interviews to FBC clients. Defterios was criticised for lobbing softball questions at Malaysian Prime Minister Najib Razak in a July 2011 interview. In response, CNN clarified that Defterios had resigned from FBC in March 2011. Defterios's date of resignation is disputed by The Independent and Sarawak Report, who claim he only left FBC after the scandal broke.

The Atlantic also launched an internal investigation due to a piece by Alan Friedman on the magazine praising the "statesmanlike debut" of Indonesian President Susilo Bambang Yudhoyono at the World Economic Forum in January 2011. Atlantic Media Company President Justin Smith sat on the board of FBC Media but resigned after the scandal broke.

=== Response by FBC ===
FBC denied all allegations. Its lawyers said the company's production and commercial divisions which "are and always have been quite separate and distinct."

After the revelations by Sarawak Report, FBC took down its website which claimed: "We control blue-chip television editorial time-slots" and can "guarantee controlled messaging from A to Z on the world's leading news channels." Its promotional message also included promising "an elite audience" via BBC World News, CNN, CNBC, The Economist, the Financial Times, Business Week, The Wall Street Journal and the International Herald Tribune. The website was replaced by a single page with basic company information.

== Collapse ==
FBC Media went into administration on 24 October 2011.

== Investigation ==
On 15 November 2011, British media regulator Ofcom announced that it is launching an investigation into FBC's practices.

The BBC Trust's editorial standards committee (ESC) found that eight programmes produced by FBC were found to breach the broadcaster's conflict of interest guidelines. While the ESC said that it had no evidence of programme sponsorship, it still concluded that FBC's production of programmes about Malaysia while having a financial relationship with the government of Malaysia was a "serious" breach of guidelines.

One of the eight programmes was made on the subject of Egypt in March 2011 during the Arab Spring. The Independent has claimed that FBC worked for the regime of toppled President Hosni Mubarak.

== See also ==
- 2010 Ukrainian presidential election
