= Bob Froehlich =

- Born: April 28, 1953 (age 72); Pittsburgh, Pennsylvania
- Occupation: author

Robert J. Froehlich (born April 28, 1953) is an American author, TV personality and lecturer. He also served as Senior Managing Director of Hartford Financial Services Group, Inc. and of various funds of Hartford Fund Complex since 2009. Froehlich was one of the youngest city managers ever in the state of Ohio. He had more than 40 years of experience in Wall Street "where he chaired investment committees for multiple global asset management organizations including Deutsche Bank, Hartford and Kemper Funds."

== Education and career ==
Froehlich was born April 28, 1953, in Pittsburgh, Pennsylvania, U.S. He received his B.A. from the University of Dayton in 1975, M.P.A. from the University of Dayton in 1976, an M.A. from Central Michigan University in 1978. He also received his Ph.D. from California Coast University in 1979 and received an honorary Doctorate of commercial science (Ph.D. in commercial sciences) from Central Michigan University in 2008.

Froehlich began his career in the public sector from 1975 to 1978, as a budget analyst for the City of Dayton, Ohio, with primary responsibility for two of the largest departments: Water and Police. From 1978 to 1981, he served as the chief financial officer for Montgomery County, Ohio's Water and Sewer District. In 1981, he was appointed the first city manager for Beavercreek, Ohio. He transitioned to the private sector in 1985, serving as a senior executive with Ernst & Whinney from 1985 to 1989. From 1989 to 1997, he held several senior executive roles at Van Kampen Merritt. In 2002, when Deutsche Bank acquired Scudder Investments, Froehlich was named vice chairman of Deutsche Asset Management, a role he held until 2009. From 2009 until his retirement in 2012, Froehlich was a senior executive with The Hartford Mutual Funds.

Froehlich made regular television appearances on CNBC, Fox News, CNN and Bloomberg TV. He was one of the regular guest co-hosts for one of CNBC's Squawk Box and The Kudlow Report. He was also selected as one of the original regular guest financial commentators when CNN launched its new network, CNNfn, in December 1995. At Fox News, Froehlich became one of the regular “special guests” on their weekend show, Bulls and Bears. He has been interviewed on well-known investment programs, including Wall Street Week, Lou Dobbs Tonight, PBS NewsHour and World Business with Alexander Haig.

Since his retirement, Froehlich has served on the boards of a variety of public, private, mutual fund and not-for-profit organizations. He currently serves on the boards of Vault Data, LLC., Galen Robotics, Inc., Highland Capital Mutual Funds, NexPoint Capital, Inc., Kane County Cougars Baseball Foundation, Inc., and The Midwest League of Professional Baseball Clubs, Inc. On June 4, 2014, he became the chairman, chief executive officer, president and owner of the Kane County Cougars, the then-Class "A" minor league baseball affiliate of the Arizona Diamondbacks. The team lost its MLB affiliation status in 2021 and is now a member of the American Association of Professional Baseball, and a member of the Midwest League.

== Published works ==
- A Guide for Understanding County Government in Ohio (January 1981)
- The Three Bears Are Dead! (April 1998)
- Where The Money Is (July 2001)
- Investment Megatrends (January 2006)
- A Bull for All Seasons (September 2008)
- ANTs: Using Alternative and Non-Traditional Investments to Allocate Your Assets in an Uncertain World (January 2011)

== Personal life ==
Froehlich is married to Cheryl and has two daughters, Marianne and Stephanie. He and his wife currently reside in Willowbrook, Illinois.
