= Alan Friedman =

American journalist, author, and former media and public relations executive (born 1956)

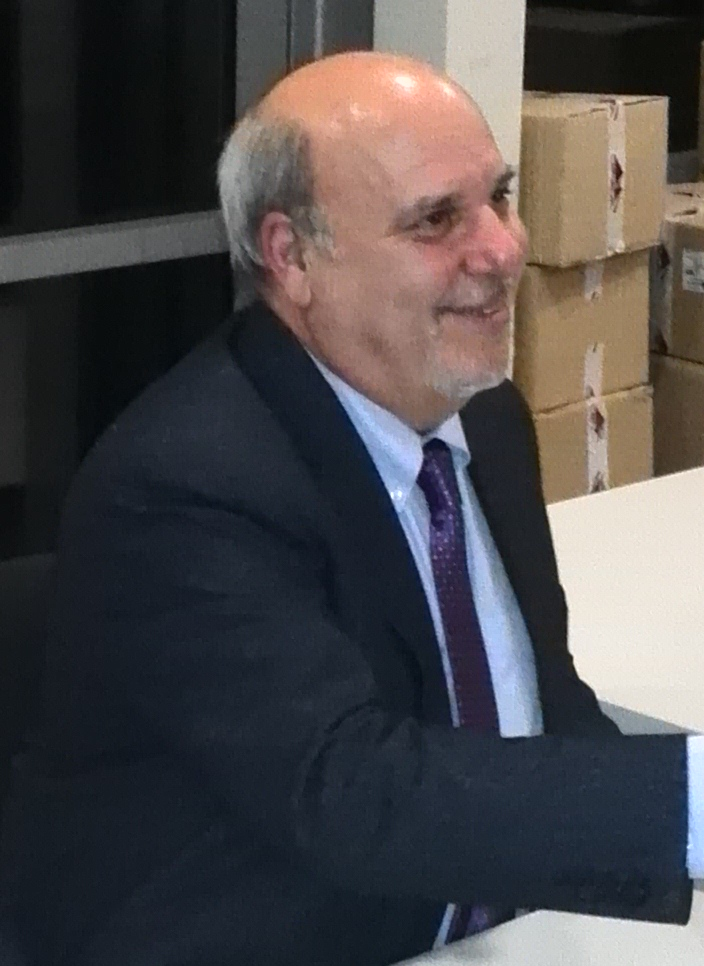
- Alan Friedman in 2014
- Born: April 30, 1956 (age 70); New York City, New York, U.S.
- Education: New York University
- Occupations: Journalist, writer
- Years active: 1983–present
- Known for: Business relationship with Paul Manafort, investigative journalist report on Iraqgate and Berlusconi IV Cabinet's fall in 2011
- Political party: Democratic (former)
- Spouse: Gabriella Carignani (m. 2013)

Alan Friedman (/ˈfriːdmən/; born April 30, 1956) is an American journalist, author, documentary writer and producer, TV anchor and former media and public relations executive.

He was a journalist at The Financial Times, International Herald Tribune, The New York Times, and The Wall Street Journal. He hosted several TV programmes on Italian TV Channels Rai, La7 and Skytg24. In Italy he was also a columnist of the Corriere Della Sera and he is currently a columnist for La Stampa.

For his work at the Financial Times of London he was a four-time winner of the British Press Award, the UK equivalent of the Pulitzer Prize.

During his career, Friedman interviewed dozens of heads of state and heads of governments. Presidents, Prime Ministers, and central bankers. Among his most famous interviews were Vladimir Putin and Donald Trump.

His most famous scoops were the Iraqgate scandal, which in 1992 exposed the involvement of the White House, the CIA and an Italian bank in sending weapons to Saddam Hussein, and the Montigate revelation, which in 2014 revealed that Mario Monti and Giorgio Napolitano were discussing the possibility of setting up a Monti-led government in Italy six months before the fall of Berlusconi's administration.

Friedman has written and produced three documentaries: "My Way: The Rise and Fall of Silvio Berlusconi", "Milano: The Inside Story of Italian Fashion", and "Giovanni da Verrazzano: From the Renaissance to New York City."

Since 2025, he has been the Director of the Lugano Global Forum, a political and economic think tank based in Lugano, Switzerland.

== Early life and education ==
Friedman was born in New York City from a Jewish family, he was educated at New York University (NYU) (B.A. Politics and History), the London School of Economics (International Relations), and the Johns Hopkins School of Advanced International Studies (M.A. International Economics and Law).

== Career ==
Friedman worked in the administration of U.S. president Jimmy Carter in the role of Presidential Management Intern. He began his professional career working for the staff of Bella Abzug (D-NY) and of Donald M. Fraser (D-MN). From 1979 to 1993, he worked for the Financial Times of London as a columnist on bonds, a banking correspondent, and a foreign correspondent in Italy and the United States. His professional relationship with the International Herald Tribune and RAI made way in 1999 to a joint venture for the co-production of the weekly programmes World Business.

Friedman was recognized as the journalist who led the report on the Iraqgate scandal in 1991 that connected the CIA with the supply of non-U.S. origin weapons to Saddam Hussein. His television career began in the early 1980s with regular appearances on BBC Newsnight. In 1991, he participated, with Ted Koppel of the ABC Nightline programme, in the production of a series of broadcasts by ABC/Financial Times on the scandal of the weapons sale to Iraq. He hosted the Alan Friedman Show, a peak talk show on the Sky TG24 news channel in Italy. It was dedicated to national and international economics and politics. From 1994 to 2003, he was global economics correspondent of the IHT.

From 2003 to 2005, Friedman was global economy columnist for The Wall Street Journal in Europe. He was executive editor of World Business, a weekly global business programme produced by FBC Media and broadcast on CNBC. Friedman founded and was chairman of FBC. The programme was cancelled in August 2011 after it was revealed that FBC acted as a public relations firm for the government of Malaysia and carried puff pieces in the shows it produced. FBC Media went into administration on October 24, 2011.

In February 2014, Friedman's new book Ammazziamo il Gattopardo (Let's Murder the Leopard) was serialized with an excerpt in the Financial Times. He received the America Award of the Italy-USA Foundation in 2014. On September 6, 2014, he was awarded the Premio Cesare Pavese, an Italian literary award, for the book. On December 2, 2014, he received the Premio Pannunzio 2014, an Italian journalism award. The motivation, read on behalf of the jury, said: "He represents a fine example of journalism in the Anglo-Saxon tradition, a journalism where facts are separated from opinions, with independent judgement in describing Italian politics, and this is very much to his credit. Friedman succeeds in putting the present into historical perspective, with objectivity and impartiality."

In June 2015, it was announced in the Italian media that Friedman would write the first authorized biography of the former Prime Minister of Italy and media tycoon Silvio Berlusconi. In a video message in the Italian newspaper La Repubblica, Berlusconi explained that for many years journalists had asked him to write his biography but had always declined. He finally decided to work with Friedman because he trusted him. Berlusconi also added: "As Steve Jobs said to his biographer: I will tell you my story. You will write what you like." His biography of Berlusconi was published in 19 languages and in 32 countries in the United States, Europe, and Asia. The first publication was in October 2015 in the United States by Hachette Books (Berlusconi: The Epic Story of the Billionaire Who Took Over Italy), in the United Kingdom by Biteback Publishing (My Way: Berlusconi in His Own Words), and in Italy by Rizzoli (My Way: Berlusconi si racconta a Friedman), in France by Michel Lafon Publishing (Berlusconi se raconte a Friedman), in the Netherlands by Spectrum (Berlusconi), and subsequently in Finland, Portugal, Poland, Bulgaria, Romania, Spain, China, Russia, Azerbaijan, Sweden, Turkey, and other countries. In the documentary My Way: The Rise and Fall of Silvio Berlusconi, Friedman leads as narrator through the research phase for his book. It first appeared on Netflix and shows interview footage with Berlusconi at his estate in Arcore. Friedman lets Berlusconi chronologically tell his life story but confronts him with allegations and leads interviews with investigators and companions.

In February 2017, Friedman published a book called This Is Not America (Biteback Publishing in United Kingdom and Newton Compton in Italy) that was critical of Donald Trump and examined the divisions in American society. The book was a bestseller in Italy for several months in 2017. In January 2018, he published a new book on the Italian economy (Newton Compton Editori), entitled Dieci cose da sapere sull’economia italiana prima che sia troppo tardi, or Ten Things To Know About The Italian Economy Before It Is Too Late, in English, which was a top ten best-seller in Italy for 17 weeks. In March 2018, Friedman gave his first TedxTalk at Oxford University to an audience of 1,800 people. In his talk, he criticized Trump for damaging the social fabric of the United States, sowing hatred and division, and leading a populist wave of demagogy that threatened America's traditions of strength through cultural diversity. Friedman also warned that Trump was attacking several pillars of American democracy with his repeated attacks on law enforcement, the Justice Department, the rule of law, the free press, and the rights of women, gays, and minorities.

A columnist for the Italian newspaper La Stampa, Friedman frequently makes appearances as an economic and political commentator in the broadcast media. In April 2022, he published a new book with La nave di Teseo, a leading Italian publisher. The book, entitled Il prezzo del futuro, is an analysis of the future of the Italian economy. In April 2022, Friedman published an exclusive interview with United States Treasury Secretary Janet Yellen in which she questioned the wisdom of the Maastricht Treaty deficit and debt rules.

In 2023, Friedman co-wrote (with Giuseppe Pedersoli) and produced the documentary "MILANO: The Inside Story of Italian Fashion" featuring protagonists of the Italian Fashion history such as Giorgio Armani, Dolce and Gabbana, Tom Ford, Domenico De Sole, Santo Versace, Pierpaolo Piccioli and may others. The film also featured interviews with top Hollywood stars such as Lauren Hutton, Sharon Stone, Frances McDormand, Helen Mirren, and Samuel L. Jackson. The film "MILANO: The inside story of Italian Fashion" is directed by the Emmy Award winner John Maggio.

MILANO was described by The New York Times as "Half nostalgia trip and half corrective to the narratives disseminated by docudramas like Ridley Scott's "House of Gucci" and Ryan Murphy's "Assassination of Gianni Versace."

== Controversy ==
From 2011 to 2013, with liaison to Viktor Yanukovych's chief of staff Serhiy Lyovochkin, Friedman, one-time CNN producer Eckart Sager, Rick Gates, Paul Manafort, and Manafort's senior aide Konstantin Kilimnik devised a strategy to discredit Yulia Tymoshenko and Hillary Clinton. This effort supported the pro-Russia administration of then president of Ukraine, Viktor Yanukovych.

In a June 2018 article, The New York Times named Friedman as a former associate of Manafort who had contacted Special Counsel Robert Mueller to inform the counsel of Manafort's attempt at witness tampering. The article described how Friedman had helped to arrange and gave advice on writing op-eds that favored Yanukovych at the behest of Manafort and that Friedman "helped lead a project to which prosecutors say Mr. Manafort funneled more than $2 million." In September 2018, Manafort pleaded guilty to witness tampering for his efforts to coach Friedman and Sager on what to say about their work for him and Yanukovych. In Manafort's statement of the offense, Friedman is identified as "Person D1".

In January 2021, during the commentary of Donald Trump's greeting speech when he left the White House by Italian RAI 1, Friedman insulted the first lady Melania Trump by naming her an escort. Friedman was punished because the television's chiefs decided to ban him.

== Personal life ==
Friedman is married to Gabriella Carignani and has no children. He currently lives between Forte dei Marmi, Italy, and Switzerland. He's an atheist.

== Books ==
- Tutto in famiglia (in Italian). Milan: Longanesi. 1988. ISBN 88-304-0834-4.
- Ce la farà il capitalismo italiano? (in Italian). Milan: Longanesi. 1989. ISBN 88-304-0916-2.
- Agnelli and the Network of Italian Power (in English). Edinburg, New York, Milan, Barcelona: Harrap, New American Library, Longanesi, Planeta. 1998. ISBN 0-453-00690-6.
- La madre di tutti gli affari (in Italian). In collaboration with Emanuela Minnai. Milan: Longanesi. 1993. ISBN 88-304-1167-1.
- Spider's Web: The Secret History of How the White House Illegally Armed Iraq (in English). New York, Milan, 1993. UK edition: Spider's Web: Bush, Saddam, Thatcher and the Decade of Deceit. London: Faber & Faber. 1993. ISBN 0-553-09650-8.
- Il bivio. L'Italia a metà strada tra crisi e transizione (in Italian). Milan: Longanesi. 1996. ISBN 88-304-1346-1.
- Ammazziamo il gattopardo (in Italian). Milan: Rizzoli. 2014. ISBN 978-88-17-07216-8.
- Berlusconi: The Epic Story of the Billionaire Who Took Over Italy (in English). New York: Hachette Books. 2015. ISBN 978-0-316-30199-2.
- This Is Not America (in English). Biteback Publishing. 2017. ISBN 978-1-78590-235-2.
- Dieci cose da sapere sull'economia italiana, prima che sia troppo tardi (in Italian). Rome: Newton Compton. 2018. ISBN 978-88-227-1419-0.
- Questa non è l'Italia. Storie segrete e verità shock dietro il nuovo volto del nostro Paese (in Italian). Rome: Newton Compton. 2019. ISBN 978-88-227-3380-1.
- Il prezzo del futuro. Perché l'Italia rischia di sprecare l'occasione del secolo (in Italian). Translated by Sandro Ristori. I fari. No. 116. Milan: La nave di Teseo. 2022. ISBN 978-88-346-0991-0.

== See also ==
- Timeline of investigations into Trump and Russia (January–June 2018)
- Timeline of investigations into Trump and Russia (July–December 2018)
