= William G. Otis =

American law professor (born 1946)

William "Bill" G. Otis (born July 27, 1946) is an adjunct law professor and former federal prosecutor who served as Special Counsel to President George H. W. Bush.

== Education and legal career ==
A graduate of the University of North Carolina (1968) and Stanford Law School (1974), Otis is currently an adjunct professor at Georgetown University Law Center. He also contributes to the legal blog Crime and Consequences.

In 2007, Otis wrote an op-ed in the Washington Post urging President George W. Bush to commute the prison sentence imposed on Scooter Libby, who had been sentenced to 30 months in prison, a $250,000 fine, and two years of probation for his role in the aftermath of the Valerie Plame affair. Approximately one month after Otis's piece appeared, Bush commuted Libby's prison sentence, while leaving the rest of the sentence intact.

Otis spent much of his career as head of the Appellate Division of the United States Attorney's Office for the Eastern District of Virginia. For ten years, he was a member of the Attorney General's Advisory Subcommittee on the Sentencing Guidelines. In 1992, during the investigation into "Iraqgate," he served as Special Counsel for President George H. W. Bush. He returned to the U.S. Attorney's Office the next year, and ended his tenure there in 1999. He returned to federal service three years later as Special Assistant to the Secretary of Energy. In 2003, he was appointed Counselor to the head of the Drug Enforcement Administration, where he remained until 2007.

Otis has appeared before both houses of the United States Congress as an expert witness on diverse subjects in criminal law including the death penalty, illegal drugs, and the United States Sentencing Commission. He has been interviewed on these and other subjects by The New York Times, The Atlantic magazine, CBS's 60 Minutes, The O'Reilly Factor, ABC News, and MSNBC. He has written op-ed pieces for various newspapers on topics including legal ethics, Miranda warnings, and the firing of U.S. Attorneys by then-Attorney General Alberto Gonzales.

== U.S. Sentencing Commission nomination ==
On March 1, 2018, President Donald Trump nominated Otis to the United States Sentencing Commission. Otis' nomination was criticized by several advocacy groups for his support of existing mandatory sentencing laws, and his views on demographics and crime. In an earlier blog post, Otis had defended a speech given by Fifth Circuit Judge Edith Jones to an audience at the University of Pennsylvania Law School, observing that in the U.S., minorities commit more violence than whites. Otis contended that Jones' speech had been challenged as offensive but not as untrue. He stated that "race and criminality have no causative relationship," and that the disproportionate commission of violent crime by blacks was a product of a breakdown in family structure, not an inherent characteristic, as the Washington Post had included in a headline it altered hours after being published. He supported his argument by pointing to the fact that persons of Asian descent (whom he described as "Orientals") have lower crime rates than whites, even though Asians had been subjected to discrimination whites did not face. He said the lower crime rates of Asian-Americans, as opposed to white or black Americans, resulted from intact, two-parent families that honor "work, education and tradition...values, not race or skin color, influence choices." Otis' nomination lapsed without action by the Senate.

== Personal life ==
A survivor of liver cancer thanks to a liver transplant, Otis is married to Lee Liberman Otis, a co-founder and officer of the Federalist Society.
