= Radio Free Sarawak =

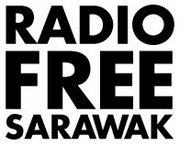
- Malaysia
- Broadcast area: Sarawak
- Frequency: 15420 kHz
- Branding: RFS

Programming
- Languages: Iban, Malay and English
- Format: Talk, news, music

Ownership
- Owner: Clare Rewcastle Brown

History
- First air date: 16 November 2010; 15 years ago

Links
- Webcast: SoundCloud iTunes link
- Website: radiofreesarawak.org

Radio Free Sarawak (Malay: Radio Sarawak Bebas) is a pirate radio station established by environmental and anti-corruption activist Clare Rewcastle Brown and helmed by former Cats FM presenter Peter John Jaban (Papa Orang Utan), Christina Suntai, who graduated from Florida Technical College in computer science and computer programming, and Michael Ngau. On the first broadcast on 16 November 2010, the station can be received on shortwave on 15420 kHz. It also produced podcasts for its programmes daily from 1100 to 1300 UTC or 7:00–9:00 pm at Sarawak local time (UTC+8). The station received wide publicity in Malaysia after the brief disappearance of Jaban. It was later discovered that he had gone into hiding voluntarily. On 15 November 2014, the radio suspended its shortwave transmission services, claiming the Sarawak state government had jammed its service.

== Purpose ==
In its own words, "Radio Free Sarawak is the independent radio station that brings you the news you want to hear, not what others want you to hear." In a report by the London Evening Standard, it was stated that the station aims to "expose the alleged corruption of Taib Mahmud, Chief Minister of ... Sarawak ... and bring an end to his 30-year rule."

The station can be seen as an attempt to bypass the control of mass media outlets in Sarawak managed by Taib's government and logging companies.

== The operators ==
=== Clare Rewcastle Brown ===
Born in colonial Sarawak to British parents, Brown is best known as an environmental and anti-corruption activist who started her career as a journalist with the BBC in 1983. In 2008, she returned to Sarawak to report on a by-election and secretly filmed companies clearing rainforests for oil palm plantations. In 2010, she anonymously founded the Malaysia-focused blog Sarawak Report to advocate for environmental causes, indigenous rights and anti-corruption.

Incidentally, Brown is the sister-in-law of former British Prime Minister, Gordon Brown.

=== Peter John Jaban ===
Better known by his on-air pseudonym, Papa Orang Utan, Jaban is an Iban from Sarawak and a former civil servant with the Land and Survey Office of Kuching. He was also a former DJ of the state-owned Cats FM radio station. Jaban worked the airwaves for that station from 1996 to 1999.

Jaban also served as the Deputy Chairperson of the Sarawak Dayak Iban Association and was active as a human rights activist in Sarawak. He is now actively involved with the Malaysian Civil Liberties Movement, a non-profit organisation based in London, United Kingdom.

In June 2012, Jaban returned to Sarawak purportedly for a medical check up in Parti Keadilan Rakyat's Miri Branch Chairman Dr.Michael Teo's clinic, when he was accosted by three men from Dr.Michael's car. A press statement released by Jaban's Democratic Action Party lawyer Alan Ling Sie Kiong indicated that prior to that, Jaban was stopped at Immigration upon his entry and was told that he would be questioned by the Malaysian Special Branch.

== Awards ==
Radio Free Sarawak received the "Free Media Pioneer" award from the International Press Institute (IPI) ahead of World Press Freedom Day in 2013.

== Reactions ==
=== Arrests ===
Podcasts of Radio Free Sarawak have also been distributed via CDs and VCDs together with TV Free Sarawak into the interior of Sarawak where the internet penetration is still low. However, on 6 January 2011, there was an incident where the activists and lawyers possessing such materials were detained by the police and home ministry officials and the materials were confiscated, citing the possible violation of the Film Censorship Act and section 4(1) of the Sedition Act (Malaysia). The activists were supposed to be charged in the magistrate court on 7 February, but home ministry officials did not turn up.

=== Government probe ===
The Sarawak Barisan Nasional had stated that they would like to see legal action taken against Radio Free Sarawak and the Home Ministry of Malaysia confirmed that an investigation was being made against the station as it was spreading "malicious lies and threatening unity and harmony among races".

=== Online downtime ===
The website of Radio Free Sarawak as well as their podcast from iTunes has been inaccessible since 9 April 2011 for unknown reasons. The inaccessibility of the website coincides with the campaigning period of the bitterly contested 2011 Sarawak elections and may be a distributed Denial of service attack. Nonetheless, the station continued its daily one-hour broadcast on shortwave from 1000 UTC - 1100 UTC. Radio Free Sarawak's sister site, Sarawak Report has also been subject to a massive cyber attack although effort are being made to get both websites back into operation. The founder, Clare Rewcastle-Brown, has commented that the attacks are "a full admission by BN that our insights and investigations have been causing them major difficulties".

== See also ==
- Sarawak Report
- List of radio stations in Malaysia
- Sarawak state election, 2011
