= Peter John Jaban =

Malaysian activist

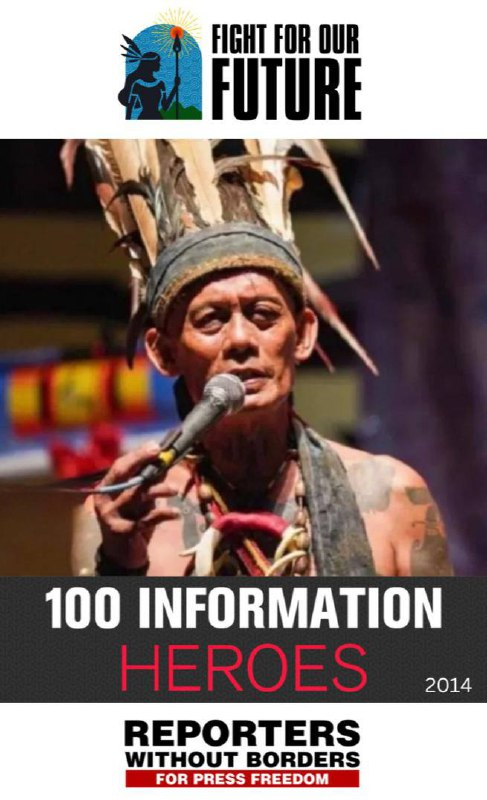
A high-profile Malaysian activist

Peter Anak Jaban, or better known as Peter John Jaban is a Malaysian activist, journalist, broadcaster, and human rights campaigner from Sarawak.

Of Dayak Iban descent, he is best known as the voice behind Radio Free Sarawak, an independent shortwave radio station that provided a platform for rural Sarawakians to voice concerns over land rights, deforestation, and political marginalisation. He has also been involved with Radio Free Malaysia and is known for his work on civil liberties, religious freedom, and Sarawak autonomy.

He is currently serving as the Deputy President of the Global Human Rights Federation (Malaysia), where he continues to advocate for the indigenous rights, inclusive governance, and freedom of expression. His work has brought attention to Sarawak-based issues both domestically and internationally, through collaborations with non-governmental organisations and diplomatic channels. He is regarded as one of the most visible figures in Sarawak's civil society landscape.

== Early life and Background ==
Born and raised in Kuching, Sarawak, Peter John Jaban is an Iban Dayak, part of the Indigenous peoples of Borneo. He studied at Ong Tiang Swee Primary School in Kuching. During his school days, he was considered an active student and participated in different clubs.

He began his career as a radio presenter & DJ and later transitioned into civil society work, using media to raise awareness of injustices affecting the rural and indigenous communities.

Prior to his activism, Peter John previously worked in various sections of the Land and Survey Department in Kuching, Sarawak before resigning in 2006. He later became a radio DJ at Cats FM, a local private radio station. He formerly served as Deputy Chairman of the Sarawak Dayak Iban Association (SADIA Kuching), an organisation focused on the rights and welfare of the Iban community. In the 2006 Sarawak state election, he contested as an independent candidate against then Deputy Chief Minister, Alfred Jabu Numpang in the Layar constituency, but was lost decisively to the latter.

== Activism ==
Peter John Jaban is considered as one of the leading prominent activist in Sarawak.

=== Roots in Indigenous Radio ===
==== Radio Free Sarawak ====
Peter first met Clare Rewcastle Brown in 2008. In November 2010, Peter was invited by Clare to join Radio Free Sarawak, a radio that campaign against deforestation and loss of native land rights, and the alleged corruption of Sarawak's chief minister Abdul Taib Mahmud. Peter also started to use his on-air pseudonym "Papa Orang Utan".

Peter was detained immediately upon his arrival at Kota Kinabalu International Airport on 31 May 2012 after a few weeks of vacation. He said that he had been "arrested and then photographed, his documents copied, before being escorted on to the airplane" and flown to Miri, Sarawak. Peter was later taken away by three unidentified men shortly after arriving in Sarawak although he was escorted by Miri PKR chairman, Dr Micheal Teo. However, Sarawak police has denied any involvement in the arrest of Peter. This incident has sparked a public outrage because Peter just disappeared without anyone knowing his location.

After 2 days, Peter was spotted and reportedly moving about freely in Miri. On the 3rd day, he contacted his colleague of Radio Free Sarawak. He apologised and clarify that the three men were good Samaritans and he decided to follow them because he feared for his safety. He did not have time to inform Micheal Teo of his intention because Teo was busy talking on the phone at that time. Peter's phone was not working because of heavy rain and thus he was unable to report his safety to his colleague in the first few days. After the incident, Peter decided to remain in Sarawak.

=== Sarawak self-determination ===
In 2013, Peter John Jaban demanded that the Sarawak government officially declare July 22 a public holiday to commemorate Sarawak Independence Day, marking the date the state gained self-government from British colonial rule in 1963. He had also been actively researching Sarawak's historical status and, in 2014, served as a speaker at a public forum organised by the Sarawak Association for Peoples’ Aspiration (SAPA) to discuss the Malaysia Agreement 1963 (MA63) and related constitutional matters.

Peter was the SAPA publicity and information chief in 2020.

Peter founded the "Sarawakians for Sarawak" and "Saya Anak Sarawak" movement in 2021.

== Filmography ==
=== Film ===
Year	Title	Genre	Role	Award
2025	No Taste Like Home	TV Series	Featuring	-
2021	Edge of the World	Feature Film	Orang Kaya	-
2016	The Borneo Case	Documentary	Featuring	IDFA Official Selection 2016
