= Riegle Report =

1994 American report on chemical warfare in Iraq

The Riegle Report, officially titled "U.S. Chemical and Biological Warfare-Related Dual Use Exports to Iraq and their Possible Impact on the Health Consequences of the Gulf War", summarized testimony before the U.S. Senate Committee on Banking, Housing, and Urban Affairs with Respect to Export Administration. The May 25, 1994, report by Committee Chairman Riegle and ranking minority member Alfonse M. D'Amato concludes that there is significant evidence that "coalition forces were exposed to mixed chemical agents as a result of coalition bombings of Iraqi nuclear, chemical, and biological facilities and that the fallout from these bombings may be contributing to the health problems currently being suffered by Gulf War veterans" following the Gulf War (1990–1991). The report also implicates the U.S. Department of Commerce as well as the American Type Culture Collection in the shipment of biological research samples to Iraq:

"Records available from the supplier for the period from 1985 until the present show that during this time, pathogenic, toxigenic, and other biological research materials were exported to Iraq pursuant to application and licensing by the U.S. Department of Commerce. Records prior to 1985 were not available, according to the supplier. These exported biological materials were not attenuated or weakened and were capable of reproduction."

Senator Riegle also called in the Congressional Record for the U.S. Department of Defense to continue to investigate the potential causes of Gulf War syndrome and to provide needed care to afflicted Gulf War veterans and their families:

"Frankly, the Defense Department does not have too much interest in [a retired Army colonel who is sick and unemployed]. They are looking ahead to other things. They are not looking back at the large number of sick veterans who are out there.

"But it does not take a Ph.D., knowing Saddam Hussein's record, knowing he had the production facilities, knowing that we went in and bombed some of those production facilities, and knowing that the things that we sent him helped him produce biological weapons, to understand that such exposures may—I underline the word may—be causing the problems of a lot of our sick veterans that otherwise are defying explanation."

== See also ==
- United States support for Iraq during the Iran–Iraq war
- Gulf War syndrome
- The Riegle report on-line at moneydick.com or see the text on Wikisource.
