= Andrew Brown (media strategist) =

Scottish journalist and broadcaster

Andrew Mavor Brown
- Born: 3 March 1956 (age 70)
- Occupation: Journalist

Andrew Mavor Brown (born 3 May 1956) is a Scottish former journalist and broadcaster who is now a media strategist with EDF Energy.

== Early life and career ==
Brown studied journalism at Edinburgh University, edited the student newspaper, and was President of the Edinburgh University Students' Association. He began working for BBC Scotland as a news reporter in 1977, before moving to London to work for his brother Gordon Brown, the future prime minister, as a research assistant in 1983. In 1987 he joined the BBC's Newsnight programme as an assistant producer. In 1989 he joined Channel 4 News, becoming a programme editor in 1994. In 1996, he joined ITN, becoming the editor of Powerhouse, one of its political programmes.

In 2003, Brown left the news industry and joined PR company Weber Shandwick as director of media strategy. In 2004, he joined French energy firm EDF Energy, as head of media relations, where as of 2011 he held the position of director of corporate communications.

== Personal life ==
Brown has two elder brothers, John and Gordon (the former United Kingdom Prime Minister). He is married to Clare Rewcastle Brown.

== Nuclear lobbying ==
The role of Brown has been discussed by the media in the context of the energy policy of the 1997–2010 Labour government and in particular the lobbying of Labour's later administrations by the nuclear industry.

== MPs' expenses libel case ==
Brown was accused by the Telegraph of accepting payments for a cleaner through the Prime Minister's expenses during the expenses scandal in May 2009 but subsequently exonerated. In an article for The Guardian, Brown's wife Clare Rewcastle Brown rebutted the accusation, saying her husband and his brother were separately paying for the cleaner's services. The Telegraph subsequently acknowledged that Andrew never received any improper benefit. An article published in the Scotland on Sunday newspaper in May 2009 repeated the accusation. This led to libel proceedings being brought by Andrew against the paper, with the paper subsequently admitting that the claim had been "entirely false".
