= Clare Rewcastle Brown =

British journalist

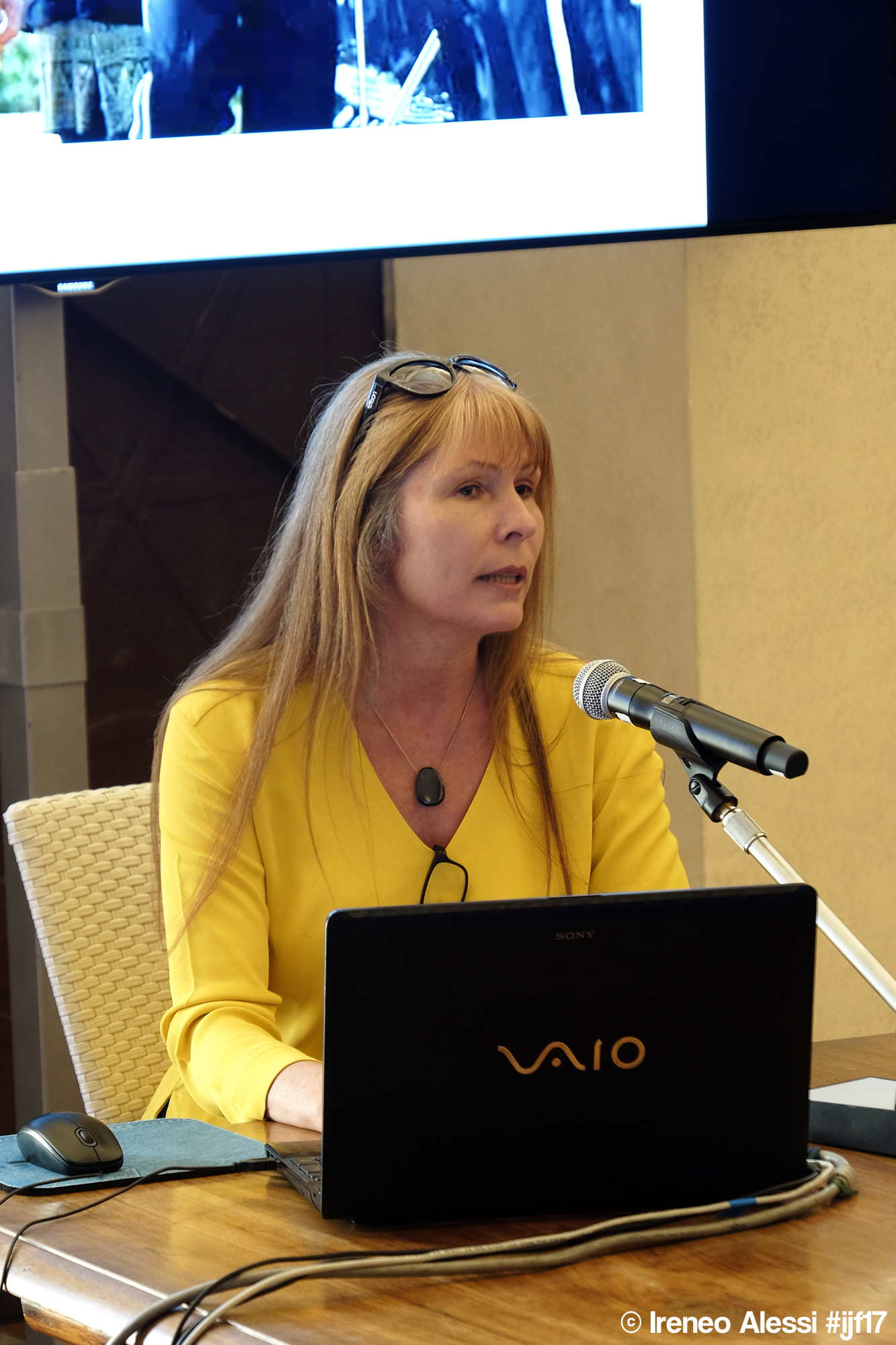
- Clare Rewcastle Brown, 2017
- Born: Clare Louise Rewcastle; 20 June 1959 (age 67); Crown Colony of Sarawak
- Education: King's College London; London School of Economics
- Occupations: Journalist; Activist; Founder of Sarawak Report
- Spouse: Andrew Brown (m. 1993)
- Children: 2
- Parents: Patrick John Rewcastle (father); Karis Louise Rewcastle (mother)
- Relatives: Gordon Brown (brother-in-law)

Clare Rewcastle Brown (born 20 June 1959) is a British environmental and anti-corruption journalist and activist who uncovered the 1Malaysia Development Berhad (1MDB) scandal. Born in the former British Crown Colony of Sarawak (now part of Malaysia), she is the founder and operator of the Sarawak Report blog and Radio Free Sarawak which have exposed corruption driving deforestation and human rights violations in that state along with failures in the global financial systems which facilitate kleptocracy. In 2015 she shifted her focus to the federal government of Malaysia and the country's prime minister, Najib Razak. Her blog Sarawak Report gained widespread recognition for its original and early exposure of the 1MDB scandal, which contributed to widespread disillusionment with Najib's Barisan Nasional government, culminating in its loss in the 2018 elections.

== Early life, education and career ==
Rewcastle Brown was born in colonial Sarawak on 20 June 1959 to British parents before the territory formed a part of Malaysia. She attended a local primary school in the neighbouring state of Sabah. Her father, Patrick John Rewcastle, served as the head of special branch in Sarawak and later, following independence, as the Superintendent of the Royal Malaysia Police in Sabah. Her mother, Karis Louise Hutchings, was a midwifery instructor and assisted in caring for indigenous infants at remote clinics. She moved to the United Kingdom when she was eight, attended private boarding school, then studied modern history at King's College London and subsequently obtained her master's degree in international relations from the London School of Economics. She became a journalist, joining the BBC World Service in 1983. She later moved to BBC current affairs television as a producer, then worked as a reporter for Sky TV and subsequently as a news and features correspondent for ITV's Carlton Television.

== Sarawak Report and Radio Free Sarawak ==
In 2006, during a visit to Sarawak for an environmental conference, Rewcastle Brown was approached by local journalists and activists to bring public attention to issues related to deforestation in the state. Her reportage led to a ban from Sarawak and claims of receiving death threats.

In February 2010, she launched Sarawak Report, a blog focused on the destruction of Sarawak’s rainforests and alleged corruption involving the state government under Chief Minister Abdul Taib Mahmud. The blog published many documents demonstrating that Taib and his family have benefited financially from land acquired from indigenous communities.

In December 2010, Rewcastle Brown established the radio station Radio Free Sarawak to provide a news source uncensored by the state for the local population. The station’s first DJ, Peter John Jaban, had been dismissed from a state-controlled radio station for allowing criticism of Taib. Rewcastle Brown and Jaban publicly identified themselves in early 2011 following the death of Ross Boyert, a former aide to Taib who had been involved in legal disputes with Taib’s real estate interests. Boyert was found dead in a Los Angeles hotel in September 2011.

Leading up to the April 2011 Sarawak state election, Rewcastle Brown reported frequent cyber attacks on Sarawak Report, attributing them to the ruling Barisan Nasional coalition, and claimed that Radio Free Sarawak’s signal was frequently jammed. Malaysian Deputy Information Communication and Culture Minister Joseph Salang Gandum labeled Radio Free Sarawak as illegal due to its lack of licensing with the Malaysian Communications and Multimedia Commission (however, as it was broadcasting from outside the country, it was legal by international broadcasting law.) In March 2011, Taib’s party, Parti Pesaka Bumiputera Bersatu (PBB), filed a police report against the station.

Rewcastle Brown was banned from entering Sarawak in July 2013 and was detained at Kuching International Airport before being sent back to Singapore. This ban was part of a broader pattern of restricting access to critics of the Sarawak government. On August 1, 2015, Malaysian Prime Minister Najib Razak, addressing UMNO delegates, criticized foreign interference in Malaysia’s affairs, implicitly referring to Rewcastle Brown.

=== 1Malaysia Development Berhad (1MDB) ===
In July 2013, Rewcastle Brown began reporting on Goldman Sachs’ involvement in arranging $6.5 billion for Malaysia’s 1MDB fund, publishing details of extraordinary profits the bank made from a deal involving dubious guarantees made to 1MDB by Abu Dhabi's wealth fund Aabar Investments and its parent company IPIC.

In December 2013, she questioned the involvement of Najib’s behind-the-scenes manager of the fund, the Malaysian businessman and playboy Jho Low, in the funding of the $100 million dollar movie The Wolf of Wall Street produced by Najib’s stepson Riza Aziz. She queried whether some of the money from 1MDB, the whereabouts of which was unclear, might have been invested in the movie and spent on the lavish living of Jho Low and Najib’s notoriously extravagant wife, Rosmah Mansor, and his family.

On February 28, 2015, in collaboration with The Sunday Times, the Sarawak Report published an exposé revealing the misappropriation of $1.83 billion from 1MDB through a supposed joint venture with a shell company called PetroSaudi. The reports laid out how the funds were siphoned off for the benefit of individuals involved in the scheme and prominent members of the Malaysian political establishment. The publication was based on documents provided by a former PetroSaudi director who became a whistleblower. They implicated Najib Razak and Jho Low, leading to increased measures by the Malaysian government against Rewcastle Brown, including the issuance of an arrest warrant and the blocking of her website.

Rewcastle Brown continued to investigate and report on 1MDB, revealing that billions were misappropriated from Goldman Sachs-managed bonds and at least $681 million was diverted to Najib’s personal accounts. She claimed she shared this information with journalists at The Wall Street Journal which helped bring international attention to the scandal. However, journalists from The Wall Street Journal have denied this, stating that their coverage was based on an independent investigation with their own sources. Additionally, she claims she provided information to the U.S. Department of Justice, leading to a significant asset seizure in 2016.

In 2015, Rewcastle Brown scrutinized the origins of the wealth of Khadem Al-Qubaisi, the CEO of the UAE's International Petroleum Investment Company (IPIC), suggesting ties to the 1MDB scandal. Following this, in April 2016, the UAE central bank froze and inspected bank accounts linked to Qubaisi and another IPIC official. Investigations confirmed financial misappropriations, leading to further UAE authority probes. In 2016, Rewcastle Brown reported on the involvement of Chinese state construction companies in laundering billions from 1MDB funds. These funds were channeled through overpriced contracts for railways and pipelines awarded by Najib Razak's Barisan Nasional government. The money was funneled through a Chinese bank in Kuwait and returned to Malaysia, to conceal financial discrepancies in 1MDB resulting from prior misappropriations. Subsequent reporting by the Sarawak Report in 2020 contributed to the 2023 conviction in Kuwait of the son of the country's former prime minister and several associates.

The electoral defeat in 2018 of Barisan Nasional, the party which had ruled the country since independence, is widely attributed to the 1MDB scandal. The new administration lifted Rewcastle Brown’s arrest warrant, allowing her to return to Peninsular Malaysia, though Sarawak maintained its entry ban. Ongoing legal proceedings followed against Najib Razak, resulting in his conviction and imprisonment.

== Target of harassment and smear campaigns ==
Rewcastle Brown has been subject to harassment, spying and smear campaigns, online and in person, which have often turned out to emanate from Western PR firms commissioned by the subjects of her investigations whose criminality she has brought to light. Meanwhile Sarawak Report has been subject to numerous cyber attacks.

In August 2011, Sarawak Report highlighted the fact that FBC Media, a media production company which produced programs for CNBC and the BBC among others, had been doubling as a public relations firm for Malaysian politicians, including Chief Minister of Sarawak Abdul Taib Mahmud. It alleged that FBC produced shows designed to cover Taib and the state government in a positive light and that it was performing similar services for corrupt regimes across the globe. In light of the revelations, CNBC cancelled World Business, a programme produced by FBC, while the BBC suspended all FBC-produced shows from their programming.

Rewcastle Brown had earlier suggested that the PR firm was part of a network commissioned by Taib to conduct a "defamation campaign" against her, including hiring journalists from a right-wing American blog The New Ledger to publish attacks on her. She also accused the PR firm hired by Taib of creating a "rival" website called Sarawak Reports, to attack her and post "propaganda material promoting Taib," and of editing her Wikipedia entry to include false allegations from such attack sites. The "rival" blog has since been taken down while FBC Media went into administration on 24 October 2011.

In December 2011, it was discovered that the public relations firm Bell Pottinger had covertly targeted the Wikipedia entry of Rewcastle Brown, among others. The blog Sarawak Bersatu, purporting to defend Sarawak from foreign influences, and its associated Twitter account, attacked Rewcastle Brown’s journalistic integrity, branded her an agent of British socialism, and spread false sexual misconduct claims about a colleague. A former Bell Pottinger employee, cited by the New Yorker, confirmed the firm’s role in producing Sarawak Bersatu’s content, employing tactics akin to what would later be recognised as “fake news.”

In 2015 Rewcastle Brown complained to Facebook that she had again become the target of an online defamation campaign, now using fake Twitter and Facebook profiles boosted through Facebook’s paid promotion services. However, Facebook and Twitter refused to cease promoting the defamatory content on the grounds the journalist was a fair target according to their rules.

At the same time Rewcastle Brown was subject to stalking and harassment in London by presumed agents of Malaysia’s secret service, a stream of legal threats from UK law firms working on behalf of those whose criminality she had written about and approaches by supposed journalists actually working for PR and private investigation firms variously attempting to collect information on her and conduct hostile interviews which they hoped to be able to use to discredit her.

== Legal issues ==
=== Criminal prosecution ===
In 2021, a criminal libel prosecution was initiated in Malaysia against Rewcastle Brown. The case, launched during the 2020-2023 tenure of a government allied with Barisan Nasional, centered on whether a phrase in Rewcastle Brown's book on the 1MDB scandal, The Sarawak Report, implied that the Sultanah had wielded undue influence over state affairs in Terengganu and whether it implied a defamatory association with Jho Low. This criminal case proceeded alongside a civil suit filed by the Sultanah against Rewcastle Brown as well as the distributor and printer of the book.

The Malaysian courts issued an arrest warrant for Rewcastle Brown in 2021 after she did not attend the initial hearing, a hearing she claims to have been unaware of prior to the warrant’s issuance. Efforts by Rewcastle Brown to have the case transferred from the Terengganu magistrates’ court to the federal court were unsuccessful. In February 2024, she was tried in absentia and convicted in the Terengganu court, subsequently being sentenced to two years in prison. Rewcastle Brown claims she had no knowledge of this trial until after it took place.

The Kuala Terengganu Magistrate’s Court noted in its judgment that Rewcastle Brown’s absence from the trial influenced the sentencing decision. The magistrate determined that adequate efforts had been made to bring her to justice, thereby justifying Rewcastle Brown being tried in absentia. Additionally, the court observed that Rewcastle Brown had evaded the charges by communicating with the investigating officer and instructing a lawyer to file a motion in the Kuala Lumpur High Court remotely. It was also noted by the magistrate that her public statements on a news portal confirmed her awareness of the charges.

The conviction has drawn criticism from both Malaysian and international journalism organizations, such as the Centre for Independent Journalism, Reporters Without Borders, Index on Censorship, the International Federation of Journalists, the International Press Institute and Media Defence. Indigenous rights organizations in Sarawak have also condemned the conviction. Rewcastle Brown is currently appealing the conviction, and Interpol has again declined to issue an international arrest warrant for her.

=== Legal correspondence and civil actions ===
Rewcastle Brown has frequently received correspondence from law firms such as Mishcon de Reya, Loeb & Loeb, and Taylor Wessing, representing clients, such as the Taib family and Riza Aziz, who alleged libel in her articles. These firms threatened legal action in response to her publications. However, when Rewcastle Brown chose not to remove the disputed content, no further legal actions were pursued.

In 2018, the law firm Schillings, representing Jho Low, who was already a fugitive, issued legal threats to attempt to prevent the UK publication of Rewcastle Brown’s book on the 1MDB scandal, The Sarawak Report: The Inside Story of the 1MDB Exposé. These threats led to the cancellation of the book’s publication by her publisher. Rewcastle Brown subsequently self-published the book but Schillings did not take legal action. Furthermore, Schillings launched a widespread legal campaign, sending letters and emails to booksellers around the world and threatening litigation if they stocked her book or Billion Dollar Whale, another publication about the 1MDB scandal. Booksellers who did not heed the firm’s warnings did not experience further legal actions.

==== Hadi Awang's libel case ====
In 2017 the law firm Carter-Ruck brought a case in the London courts on behalf of Hadi Awang, the President of the Malaysian Islamic Party (PAS). The case, which was settled in 2019 in favor of Rewcastle Brown, stemmed from a 2016 Sarawak Report article. This article suggested that the UMNO party, led by Prime Minister Najib Razak, had covertly funded PAS, ostensibly an opposition party, with amounts reportedly totaling RM90 million. Although the article did not name Hadi, he claimed that it implied that he had personally received corrupt payments, thereby defaming him. PAS financially supported the litigation. In response, Rewcastle Brown presented evidence of extravagant expenditures by PAS leaders and cash transfers from UMNO officials to PAS entities. She also filed a counterclaim alleging a harassment campaign by bloggers aligned with PAS. After incurring legal costs reportedly exceeding one million pounds with Carter-Ruck, Hadi settled with Rewcastle Brown, who reportedly received a payment of RM1.4 million (£360,000) towards her legal costs. She did not remove or alter the article on her website.

==== Sultanah of Terengganu's libel case ====
The civil case brought by the Sultanah of Terengganu in 2018 in the Malaysian courts against Rewcastle Brown centred on whether a phrase in Rewcastle Brown’s book The Sarawak Report implied that the Sultanah had exercised undue influence in state affairs. Rewcastle Brown’s Malaysian distributor, Gerakbudaya Enterprise publisher Chong Ton Sin, and printer, Vinlin Press Sdn Bhd, were co-defendants. The Sultanah’s lawyers demanded RM300 million (approximately $100 million) in damages.

In December 2023, Rewcastle Brown and her co-defendants were ordered to pay RM300,000 in defamation damages (a thousandth of the sum the Sultanah had demanded) and RM120,000 in legal costs to the Sultanah. They are appealing the verdict.

==== Involvement in UK Anti-SLAPP coalition ====
Due to the significant number of legal attacks to which she has been subject, Rewcastle Brown has become a notable figure in the UK Anti-SLAPP Coalition, which aims to address ‘lawfare’ and the vexatious use of legal systems to suppress public interest reportage. She spoke at the coalition’s first two annual conferences and has appeared before a UK parliamentary committee that is considering potential legal reforms.

== Publications ==
Clare Rewcastle Brown is the author of two books which are first-hand accounts of her role in exposing the 1MDB scandal.

- The Sarawak Report: The Inside Story of the 1MDB Exposé (2018) ISBN 9781527219366
- The Wolf Catcher: The true story of how one woman exposed the world's biggest heist (2019) ISBN 152724475X

(The latter book, co-authored with Eddie Barnes, is an abridged version of the former.)

She is also the author of a chapter, 'Malaysia: a case study in global corruption', in the third edition of Investigative Journalism, published by Routledge, and co-author (with Caleb Diamond) of another chapter, 'Sovereign Wealth Funds as Vehicles for Money Laundering: The Case of 1MDB', in Sovereign Wealth Funds: Corruption and Other Governance Risks, published by the Carnegie Endowment for International Peace.

== Awards and accolades ==
- International Press Institute’s Pioneer of Media Freedom Award (2013)
- Queensland University’s Communication for Social Change Award (2014)
- One World Media Special Award (2015)
- Fortune Magazine named her one of the World’s 50 Greatest Leaders (2016)
- Great Britain’s Women of the Year Award (2016)
- Guardian Award for International Fraud Reporting from the Association of Certified Fraud Examiners (2018)
- Environmentalist of the Year Award from the Bob Brown Foundation (2018)
- United Nations Office on Drugs and Crime/Sheikh Tamim Bin Hamad Al Thani International Anti-Corruption Excellence Award for investigative journalism from the Rule of Law and Anti-Corruption Center (2023)

== Media appearances ==
Rewcastle Brown has frequently appeared on television throughout her career, latterly to talk about the 1MDB scandal and kleptocracy more generally. A selection of her appearances include:

- The Fight for Sarawak (Australian Broadcasting Corporation (ABC), April 2011)
- Family Trees (Canadian Global News, December 2011), about the Taib family property company Sakto Corporation in Canada
- The Last Frontier (101 East, Al Jazeera and Dateline, SBS, August 2012), on Australian investment in Sarawak's dam and timber business and its links to Chief Minister of Sarawak Abdul Taib Mahmud's cousin Hamed Sepawi
- House of Saud: A Family at War (BBC, 2018)
- This Giant Beast That is the Global Economy (2019)
- Dirty Money (Netflix, 2023)

She has also featured in a number of documentary films:

- The Borneo Case (2016), a documentary about the devastation of Sarawak
- M for Malaysia (2019)
- Wirecard: The Billion Euro Lie (Sky, 2021)
- Man on the Run (Netflix, 2023)

In 2021, it was announced that Rod Lurie would direct and Doug Belgrad would produce a feature film about Clare Rewcastle Brown’s role in exposing the 1MDB scandal.

== Personal life ==
Clare Rewcastle Brown is married to Andrew Brown, the younger brother of former British Prime Minister Gordon Brown.
