= Sarawak Dayak Iban Association =

Community organization

- Formation: 1919
- Headquarters: Kuching
- Location: Sarawak, Borneo

Sarawak Dayak Iban Association (SADIA) is a community organization representing the Iban community of Sarawak. Formerly known as the Dayak Federation, it was formed in 1919 and renamed to its current title in 1984.
