= John Defterios =

American journalist (born 1961)

John K. Defterios
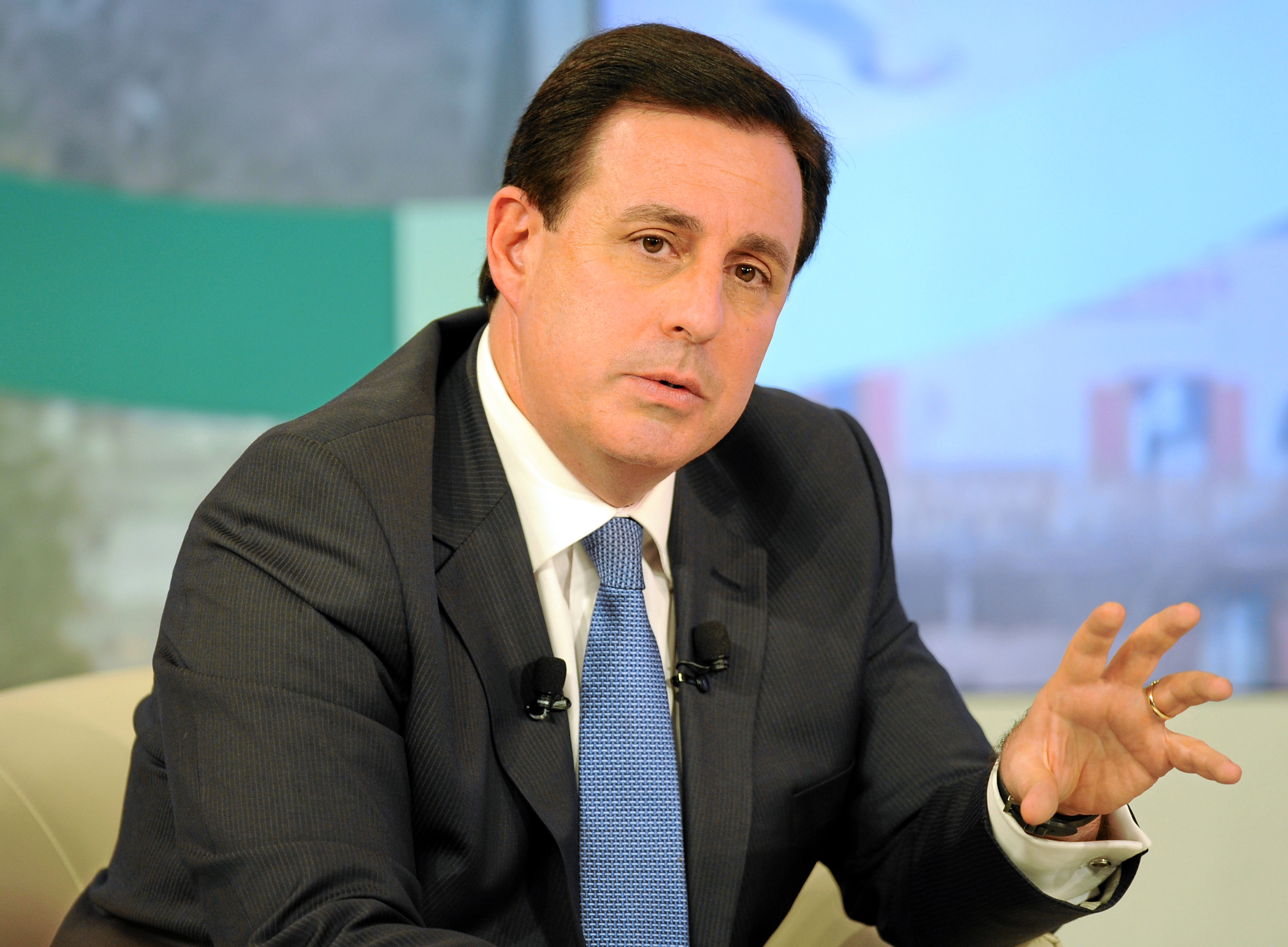
- Defterios at the World Economic Forum annual meeting in 2012
- Born: April 7, 1961 (age 65); United States
- Education: University of Southern California (BA, 1984)
- Occupation: Journalist
- Years active: 1980s–present
- Employer: CNN (1980s–2021)
- Title: CNN Business Emerging Markets Editor
- Spouse: Manuela Mirkos (m. 2002)

John K. Defterios (born April 7, 1961) is an American journalist best known for his work at CNN. He was CNN Business Emerging Markets Editor on CNN International. He left the company in May 2021, after 35 years.

== Education ==
Defterios graduated from the University of Southern California in 1984 with degrees in journalism and political science.

== Career ==
Defterios started as an intern at CNN when the network was launched in the early 1980s. He worked for Reuters Television from 1984 to 1992, serving as European correspondent and special series producer for Nightly Business Report, a joint venture with PBS.

In 1988, Defterios served as European Correspondent and Bureau Chief based in London, managing the editorial joint-venture with Reuters Television. In that post, Defterios covered the fall of the Berlin Wall. In 1990-91, Defterios covered the Gulf War from Kuwait.

He was a media leader of the World Economic Forum in 1996, chaired the CNNMoney Roundtable at the annual meeting in Davos and in 2013 chaired the St. Petersburg International Economic Forum with Vladimir Putin and Angela Merkel.

He joined CNN in 1992, serving as a correspondent for Lou Dobbs Moneyline in New York City. He hosted World Business Today from 1994 to 1996 in London. He also served as anchor of Ahead of the Curve and Business Unusual and was principal anchor for CNNfn in New York. Starting in October 2007, Defterios hosted Marketplace Middle East on CNN International. In November 2011, he began presenting Global Exchange, focusing on emerging markets, from Abu Dhabi. He is also currently CNN's Emerging Markets Editor.

The Californian has secured numerous exclusive interviews during breaking news stories including the UAE's Minister of Foreign Affairs on Day 1 of the 2017 Qatar diplomatic crisis and economic embargo against Qatar by Saudi Arabia, Bahrain, Egypt and the UAE.

Defterios was the first global broadcast journalist to enter Iran's oil fields for a series of special reports after the 2015 international nuclear agreement with Iran.

== External work ==
Beyond his work for CNN and CNNMoney.com, Defterios was a columnist for two of the leading English language newspapers in the Middle East and North Africa, Gulf News and Arab News.

Defterios has covered oil and gas for the past three decades and has been recognized for his analysis of the sector.

Defterios has chaired leading global summits and forums for the past two decades including: World Economic Forum, OPEC Seminar, Atlantic Council Energy Summit, Gulf Intelligence Energy Forum, U.A.E. Government Summit, U.S.-Saudi Arabia Investment Summit, Islamic Development Bank Annual Meetings, International Monetary Fund Round table, International Renewable Energy Agency's Ministerial Round Tables, Africa Global Business Forum and St. Petersburg International Economic Forum.

== Controversy ==
Until 2011, Defterios had been president of production company FactBased Communications (FBC), which had led a covert campaign since 2008 to generate media coverage favorable to the Malaysian government of the time. Upon discovery that several of their programs were part of the campaign, the BBC and CNBC abruptly canceled them. Shortly after leaving FBC, Defterios began reporting on the Middle East for CNN, and in July conducted an interview with then-Malaysian Prime Minister Najib Razak. One week earlier, Malaysian security forces had arrested hundreds of protesters demanding electoral reform, and critics accused Defterios of asking him softball questions. As of August the same year, Defterios was still listed as a director and shareholder at FBC in company information filed with the UK Companies House. Defterios received CNN's support, which noted that he was not in violation of its rules at the time.

== Personal life ==
Defterios married Manuela Mirkos, at the time an employee of The New York Times, in a Greek Orthodox ceremony on the island of Sifnos in 2002. He lives in Abu Dhabi, United Arab Emirates, and once reported to CNN on a regular basis from their London offices.
