= United States support for Iraq during the Iran–Iraq War =

- Iraq: United States

Diplomatic mission
- Embassy of Iraq, Washington, D.C.: Embassy of the United States, Baghdad

During the Iran–Iraq War, which began with the Iraqi invasion of Iran on September 22, 1980, the United States adopted a policy of providing support to Iraq in the form of several billion dollars' worth of economic aid, dual-use technology, intelligence sharing (e.g., IMINT), and special operations training. This U.S. support, along with support from most of the Arab world, proved vital in helping Iraq sustain military operations against Iran. The documented sale of dual-use technology, with one notable example being Iraq's acquisition of 45 Bell helicopters in 1985, was effectively a workaround for a ban on direct arms transfers; U.S. foreign policy in the Middle East dictated that Iraq was a state sponsor of terrorism because of the Iraqi government's historical ties with groups like the Palestinian Liberation Front and the Abu Nidal Organization, among others. However, this designation was removed in 1982 to facilitate broader support for the Iraqis as the conflict dragged on in Iran's favor. Of particular interest for contemporary Iran–United States relations is a conspiracy theory alleging that the U.S. government actively encouraged Iraqi president Saddam Hussein to invade Iran following the Islamic Revolution. Proponents of this theory, particularly in the Arab world, assert that there is evidence of the U.S. government having greenlit Saddam's intention to launch the campaign, but no direct documentary proof of such a collusion has been found, and several scholars and American officials have denied that such collaboration was in play prior to the conflict.

U.S. support for Iraq was not covert, especially during the Reagan administration, and was frequently the subject of open sessions in the Senate and the House of Representatives. On June 9, 1992, British-American journalist Ted Koppel reported on ABC News Nightline that the "Reagan/Bush administrations permitted—and frequently encouraged—the flow of money, agricultural credits, dual-use technology, chemicals, and weapons to Iraq." The decision by the U.S. and the Western Bloc to openly oppose Iran was made less complicated by the fact that the Soviet Union and the Eastern Bloc had also adopted the same position, with both sides seeking to contain the Iranian policy of exporting the Islamic Revolution; Iran's new government, led by Ruhollah Khomeini, had antagonized the Americans and the Soviets (the "Great Satan" and the "Lesser Satan") as part of an effort to mobilize Shia Islamism throughout the Muslim world. According to the Stockholm International Peace Research Institute, more than 90% of Iraqi arms imports during the Iran–Iraq War came from the Soviet Union, France, and China.

Despite the U.S. government's official position, the view of American officials on the conflict was geared toward simply preventing an Iranian victory rather than being enthusiastically supportive of Iraq's ambitions, as encapsulated in a remark by American diplomat Henry Kissinger that "It's a pity they both can't lose." On August 20, 1988, the Iran–Iraq War came to an end by the belligerents' acceptance of United Nations Security Council Resolution 598, which stipulated their return to the status quo of the 1975 Algiers Agreement. The result of the conflict was ultimately inconclusive, though both sides claimed victory; Iraq's drained human and financial resources, including national debt to other countries, would go on to serve as one of the bases for the Iraqi invasion of Kuwait in 1990. As part of the ensuing Gulf War, the U.S. re-designated the country as a state sponsor of terrorism and led a 42-country United Nations coalition to end the Iraqi occupation by force. International sanctions against Iraq, which were first imposed during the Kuwaiti campaign, continued until the 2003 U.S. invasion of Iraq.

== U.S. reaction to the conflict ==
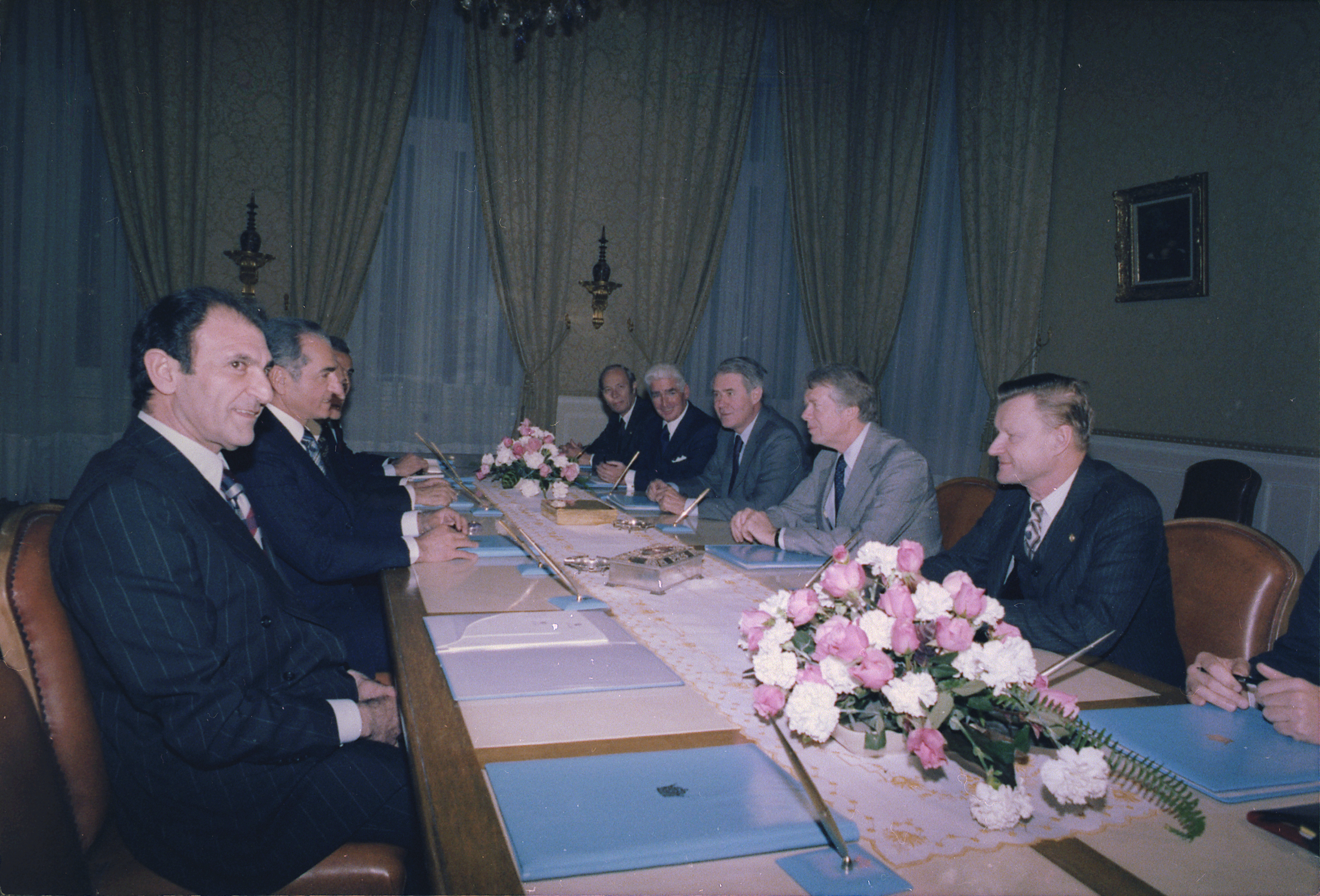
The Iranian Shah Mohammad Reza Pahlavi meeting with President Jimmy Carter and Zbigniew Brzezinski, 1977.

=== U.S. intelligence sharing with post-Revolutionary Iran ===
Following the Iranian Revolution, the Carter administration continued to see Iran as a bulwark against Iraq and the Soviet Union, and therefore attempted to forge a strategic partnership with the new Interim Government of Iran under Prime Minister Mehdi Bazargan. Chargé d'affaires at the American embassy in Tehran, Bruce Laingen, realized that Iranian officials were acutely interested in U.S. intelligence on Iraq, and convinced Assistant Secretary of State for Near Eastern Affairs Harold H. Saunders to approve an intelligence-sharing liaison with the Iranian government, culminating in an October 15, 1979 meeting between longtime Central Intelligence Agency (CIA) officer George W. Cave and the Iranian Deputy Prime Minister Abbas Amir-Entezam and Foreign Minister Ebrahim Yazdi. Cave told Mark J. Gasiorowski that he briefed Entezam and Yazdi on Iraqi military preparations and covert operations seemingly designed to facilitate a large-scale invasion of Iran, although no final decision had been made (the content of Cave's briefing was corroborated by Laingen, Yazdi, Entezam, and Bazargan). In particular, echoing a March 1979 warning from Pentagon analyst Howard Teicher regarding Iraqi designs on Iran's oil-rich Khuzestan province, Cave pointed out that Iraq had created a front organization that could instigate unrest among Khuzestan's majority–Arab inhabitants—yet Cave emphasized that war could still be avoided if the strength of Iran's armed forces did not continue its post-revolutionary decline.

Cave also urged his Iranian interlocutors to monitor the movement of Iraqi troops using the CIA-built IBEX systems from the reign of the Shah. Although Teicher and Cave's predictions proved accurate, they were the product of circumstantial evidence disputed internally within the U.S. government, and the significance of Cave's briefing has been debated. For example, according to Bureau of Intelligence and Research (INR) analyst Wayne White, who was not aware of the intelligence that informed Cave's briefing: "The Iraqi army was doing little more than continuing its well-known annual schedule of primarily battalion and brigade-level training exercises ... Very little of the Iraqi military was anywhere near the Iraqi-Iranian frontier." Similarly, the head of the Iran desk at the State Department, Henry Precht, stated: "I had no impression at the time that anyone believed Iraq was planning a major attack although we thought that [Iraqi President] Saddam [Hussein] might be stirring up the Kurds. At the time I did not think he would take on his larger and still probably more potent neighbor." On the other hand, Gasiorowski contended that "If Iran's leaders had acted on the information provided in Cave's briefings ... the brutal eight–year [Iran–Iraq War] might never have occurred."

=== Pre-war relations between Iraq and Iran ===
The Iraqi invasion of Iran in September 1980 was preceded by a long period of tension between the two countries throughout 1979 and 1980, including frequent border skirmishes, calls by Iranian leader Ruhollah Khomeini for the Shia Muslims in Iraq to revolt against the ruling Sunni Ba'ath Party, and allegations of Iraqi support for ethnic separatists in Iran. On June 18, 1979, U.S. chargé d'affaires Charlie Naas asked Yazdi about the deterioration in relations; Yazdi stated he "does not know what might be bothering Iraq ... certainly we have done nothing to bother them." Khomeini had recently condemned Iraq's arrest of Shi'ite leader Muhammad Baqir al-Sadr, but Yazdi claimed this had nothing to do with any effort to export the Islamic Revolution to Iraq: Iran was merely concerned with protecting the sacred Shi'ite sites in Najaf and Karbala. Nevertheless, in a subsequent conversation between Naas and Entezam, it emerged that the latter was unaware of National Iranian Radio and Television's broadcasts denouncing Iraq.

Continuing to seek good relations with Iranian authorities, U.S. officials uncovered considerable evidence of Iraqi support for Kurdish rebels in Iran under the leadership of Jalal Talabani. While these rebels were not considered capable of overthrowing the Iranian government militarily, they were undermining Iranian moderates, prompting Precht to broach the possibility of meeting with Iraqi officials to persuade them that Iraq's support for the Kurds was not in its best interest. Throughout this time, Chris Emery states that Iraq's intentions toward Iran were not entirely clear, as Saddam invited an Iranian delegation to the country following his assumption of the presidency in July, while the CIA concluded in November (despite Cave's warning the previous month) that Iraq sought a diplomatic settlement with Iran. Saddam was willing to work with Iranian moderates such as Yazdi, whom he met in Havana in October, but the collapse of Bazargan's government following the November 4th seizure of the U.S. embassy and initiation of the Iran hostage crisis—and the resulting consolidation of power under Khomeini—"would profoundly change Saddam's decision-making calculus," according to Emery. While the Iraqi archives suggest that Saddam contemplated invading Iran as early as February 1979, he was deterred from doing so until July 1980, at which point post-revolutionary purges had rendered Iran grossly unprepared for the attack. A key July 1980 report by Iraqi military intelligence concluded: "It is clear that, at present, Iran has no power to launch wide offensive operations against Iraq, or to defend on a large scale."

=== Claims of U.S. involvement and "greenlight" accusations ===
Iranian leaders, including Khomeini and his successor Ali Khamenei, have long espoused a belief that the U.S. gave Saddam Hussein a "green-light" to launch the invasion of Iran. U.S. officials have strongly denied this charge. Joost Hiltermann observes that a U.S. green-light is also "the conventional wisdom in the Arab world." In fact, Iranian suspicions that the U.S. would use Iraq to retaliate for the hostage-taking predated the invasion, as Carter noted in his diary on April 10, 1980: "The Iranian terrorists are making all kinds of crazy threats to kill the American hostages if they are invaded by Iraq—whom they identify as an American puppet." There are several reasons for this perception, including some circumstantial evidence.

First, although the Carter administration had been interested in engagement with Iraq since 1977, the longstanding U.S.-Iran alliance effectively rendered this impossible. After the dramatic break in Iran–United States relations, however, both American and Iraqi officials made a number of positive gestures toward one another; notably, Saddam publicly condemned the Soviet invasion of Afghanistan, and on April 10, Under Secretary of State for Political Affairs David D. Newsom, offered "to resume diplomatic relations with Iraq at any time." Saddam later stated that Iraq had accepted Newsom's offer shortly before the outbreak of the war, but "when the war started, and to avoid misinterpretation, we postponed the establishment of relations." In another widely publicized remark, Carter's National Security Advisor Zbigniew Brzezinski told a television interviewer on April 14 that "We see no fundamental incompatibility of interests between the United States and Iraq ... we do not feel that American–Iraq relations need to be frozen in antagonism." Moreover, the CIA—desperate for intelligence on Iran—maintained contacts with Iranian opposition figures including Shapour Bakhtiar and Gholam Ali Oveissi, who were themselves in touch with Iraqi officials and had encouraged Saddam to invade. Although there is no evidence that either Bakhtiar or Oveissi were acting at the behest of the U.S., Iranian awareness of such contacts through documents seized in the U.S. embassy fueled suspicion.

The July 9 Nojeh coup plot, a failed military coup d'état against Khomeini funded by Iraqi intelligence through Bakhtiar, solidified the Iranian view that the U.S. and Iraq were conspiring to reverse the Iranian Revolution. Bakhtiar falsely told the plotters that their efforts had the "blessing" of America, but there was no U.S. involvement. After a peak earlier in 1980, Saddam reduced bilateral tensions with Iran leading up to the coup attempt, perhaps seeing a successful coup as an alternative to war. In August, Saddam made a trip to Saudi Arabia in which King Khalid is reported to have pledged Saudi support for an invasion of Iran, which Bryan R. Gibson commented was "a very significant gesture, especially in light of the closeness of American–Saudi relations." United States Secretary of State Alexander Haig told Carter's successor, Ronald Reagan, that it was during this visit that "President Carter gave the Iraqis a green light to launch the war against Iran through [Crown Prince] Fahd," but at a 2008 conference several academics and former U.S. officials questioned the veracity of this assertion as well as the motives of both Haig and Fahd in promulgating it. As described by Malcolm Byrne: "The American veterans were unanimous that no 'green light' was ever given, and that the Haig document, while intriguing on its face, leaves far too much room for interpretation to be definitive. ... the Saudi comments did not address the various policy arguments that militated against an invasion—chiefly, the potential danger posed to the American hostages in Tehran". In the view of Hal Brands: "Haig had not been in government in September 1980 ... The Haig memo therefore provides hard evidence only of the fact that one of the secretary's sources believed the green light thesis to be true." On the other hand, senior U.S. diplomat Chas Freeman told journalist Andrew Cockburn that "he remembers coming across a 'memcon' summarising a meeting in late June 1980—three months before the war began—between Carter's national security adviser, Zbigniew Brzezinski, and a senior Iraqi diplomat. In the meeting Brzezinski clearly stated that America would be content with an Iraqi attack on Iran—a green light if ever there was one."

Additionally, sources linked to the Iranian government have accused Brzezinski of personally meeting with Saddam in Amman, Jordan in July 1980. King Hussein of Jordan is said to have acted as an interlocutor, but two of the king's biographers—Avi Shlaim and Nigel J. Ashton—found nothing to corroborate that such a meeting occurred. Gary Sick, a close aide who accompanied Brzezinski during a 1980 trip to the Middle East, told Brands that the meeting as described was impossible: "I was with him at least 14 hours a day, including a brief visit to Jordan, and I can attest absolutely that (1) Iraq was not on the agenda, and (2) he could not physically have made such a visit—even if he stayed up all night and got a secret flight to Baghdad," the latter being a variation on the original claim. Nevertheless, Sick states that "a year before the war," Saddam did in fact meet with King Hussein and CIA officials in Amman; per Sick, having received no "red light" from the U.S., this amounted to a "green light" to Saddam, although "this hardly constituted a US-backed war against Iran."

French historian Pierre Razoux wrote, "a meticulous analysis of the events, context, and statements by contemporary authorities, combined with more recent sources and interviews granted by certain key participants, has left no doubt that the American government did not push Saddam Hussein to criminal behavior".

=== Prelude to the Iraqi invasion of Iran ===
On April 9, the Defense Intelligence Agency (DIA) received information from a human source considered reliable, postulating a 50% chance Iraq would invade Iran. An April 11 CIA analysis is more blunt: "Evidence indicates that Iraq had probably planned to initiate a major military move against Iran with the aim of toppling the Khomeini regime"—and had "sought to engage the Kuwaitis to act as intermediary in obtaining United States approval and support for Iraqi military action against Iran." Carter himself has confirmed that fear the U.S. hostages would be executed if Iraq attacked was one reason he approved a failed rescue mission on April 24. In light of these alerts, the claims of senior Carter administration officials involved with Iran—including White, Naas, Precht, and Sick—that they were surprised by the invasion require some explanation.

Brands states that the April 9 DIA memo "was an outlier in the overall pattern of American intelligence analysis" and that "the one US official [Teicher] who claims to have anticipated the invasion (in a report dated November 1979) laments that he had no luck convincing anyone else in the national security apparatus that such an eventuality was likely." Emery hypothesizes that these warnings went unheeded because "those who doubted they amounted to compelling evidence won the argument"; it was not until September 17 that the CIA indicated "the intensification of border clashes between Iran and Iraq has reached a point where a serious conflict is now a distinct possibility." Even then, State Department official W. Nathaniel Howell recounted that the majority of his colleagues thought Saddam was bluffing. White recalled: "The outbreak of war [on September 22] did, in fact, come as a surprise to most of us because a decent portion of Iraq's ground forces were still in garrison. The hasty movement of the remaining units up to the front immediately after the beginning of major hostilities was the activity that tended to nudge me toward the abrupt scenario in which Saddam ordered the attack before all military preparations had been completed." According to Gibson, Iraq also kept its invasion plans secret from the Soviets, despite this being a violation of a 1972 treaty. Technically, Brands states that senior Iraqi official Tariq Aziz waited until September 21 to brief officials in Moscow about the invasion which would take place the next day, thereby remaining in formal compliance with the Soviet–Iraqi treaty of friendship and cooperation. Thus, in Emery's view, "it is unlikely that the United States was ever in possession of clear evidence of Saddam's intention to invade Iran. ... the disorganized and apparently impetuous nature of the invasion, with much of the Iraqi army still in garrison, and occurring in the context of border skirmishes and aggressive propaganda, muddied the waters for U.S. observers."

CIA analyst Bruce Riedel notes that U.S. intelligence officials closely monitored Soviet military exercises for an invasion of Iran throughout 1980. The Special Coordination Committee (SCC) of the U.S. National Security Council (NSC) was very concerned about preventing Soviet encroachment into Iran, a consideration which precluded the Carter administration from taking stronger measures against Iran in response to the hostage crisis. In September 1980, the SCC resolved to warn the Soviets that if they invaded Iran, it would be considered cause for war with the United States. In sum, as described by Brands, "the Carter administration's attention was elsewhere in the period preceding the invasion; at an NSC meeting on the Persian Gulf on 12 September, it was the possibility of a Soviet, not an Iraqi, invasion of Iran that occasioned preoccupation."

=== U.S. initial neutrality during the war ===
Once the war began, the Carter Administration's policy was broadly neutral and included several actions that favored Iran, although these could also be seen as aimed primarily at preventing a wider war. While many U.S. officials were optimistic that limited Iraqi gains would force Iran to agree to an arms-for-hostages deal (this proved unnecessary because Iran purchased adequate arms and equipment from Syria, Libya, North Korea, the Soviet Union, and Israel), a consensus soon emerged that the war had disrupted whatever progress had been made during negotiations with Sadeq Tabatabaei. When Iraq unilaterally attempted to station MiG-23 aircraft, helicopters, and special forces in several Persian Gulf states to use for operations against Iran, the Iraqi presence was initially tolerated in Oman and Ras al Khaimah of the United Arab Emirates (UAE), but U.S. officials, fearful of a regional conflict, "successfully pressured Omani and UAE officials to refuse Saddam's request," per Brands. The State Department warned Saddam against annexing Iranian territory. On October 3, Brzezinski advised Carter that "we should actively seek new contacts with Iran to explore the possibility of helping it just enough to put sufficient pressure on Iraq to pull back from most, if not all, its current acquisitions," citing the need "to safeguard Iran from Soviet penetration or internal disintegration." The U.S. tried, unsuccessfully, to stop the flow of weapons from Jordan to Iraq. Despite this, the U.S. tolerated the provision of weapons and intelligence from Egypt to Iraq, in exchange for Iraq's assistance in ending the diplomatic isolation Egypt had endured as a result of its peace treaty with Israel. In addition, Emery states that the U.S. worked to ensure "that Iraq's ability to export [oil] through the Gulf ... could be quickly restored after the cessation of hostilities". According to Peter Hahn, "Carter first contemplated sending military aid to Iraq only in December, after he had lost the presidential election of 1980."

Brands's analysis of U.S. archival documents suggests that U.S. officials were generally dismayed by Iraq's invasion, but Brzezinski may have been an exception. Sick recalled that "Zbig made no secret of the fact that he saw the Iraqi attack as a potentially positive development that would put pressure on Iran to release the hostages" in exchange for spare parts for Iran's largely U.S.-built military (yet Sick denied any foreknowledge of the invasion by Brzezinski). However, Brzezinski's plan was undermined, at least in the short-term, by Israel and Vietnam supplying the U.S.-origin spares that Iran needed. Brands considers it ironic that "the green light thesis ... assumes that the Carter administration was clever enough to manoeuvre a dictator with a history of antipathy to the United States into a disastrous war, but clumsy enough that it failed to prevent an ally [Israel] from taking actions that would bankrupt the entire initiative."

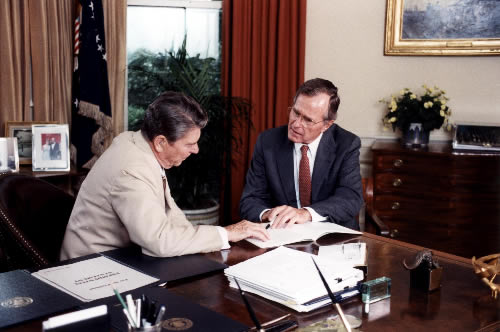
President Ronald Reagan and Vice President George H. W. Bush work in the Oval Office of the White House, July 20, 1984.

In Emery's judgment, claims that the Reagan administration's later "tilt" in favor of Iraq was merely a continuation of Carter-era policies cannot be supported by available evidence: "The impetus for America to adjust its policy of neutrality, and take a definitive position on which side to back, came in 1982, when the Iranian military threatened to overrun Iraq." In Carter's own account, "I despised Saddam Hussein, because he attacked Iran when my hostages were being held. It was President Reagan who established diplomatic relations with Saddam Hussein after I left office." Gibson avers: "If Washington had any foreknowledge of the invasion, logic would suggest that the timing would be postponed until after the hostages were successfully released." Williamson Murray and Kevin M. Woods describe the green-light theory as having been "convincingly debunked," citing Gibson. Hahn states that "there is no evidence to support the Iranian contention" that the U.S. helped instigate the conflict, finding several holes in this theory. Brands concludes: "There is no hard evidence that a green light was given, while there is substantial documentary proof that the Carter administration neither expected nor welcomed the war."

As of 2012, no reference to an agreement with the U.S. regarding the invasion of Iran has been found in available Iraqi archives. To the contrary, in an October 17, 1980 meeting Aziz was recorded worrying that "Khomeini may not support it, but for his hatred of us he will accept [U.S. support] over an agreement with us," and in the same meeting Saddam speculated that U.S. airborne early warning and control systems (AWACs) supplied to Saudi Arabia were being used to spy on Iraq: "They are monitoring the operations zone and we do not feel safe from such a procedure ... We are afraid that the information collected will go [to] the Iranians in one way or another." Regardless of whether the U.S. provided any express green-light to Saddam, Iranians continue to view the failure of the United Nations Security Council (UNSC) to condemn Iraq's invasion—or to recognize Iraq as the aggressor until after Iraq's invasion of Kuwait nearly a decade later—as a form of tacit complicity in Iraq's aggression against Iran—not just on the part of the U.S., but the entire world.

== Support ==
=== U.S. shift toward backing Iraq by 1982 ===
By mid-1982, the war's momentum had shifted decisively in favor of Iran, which invaded Iraq to depose Saddam's government. Riedel recounted: "You just had a series of catastrophic Iraqi defeats. They had been driven out of Iran, and the Iraqi army looked like it was falling apart." "The Reagan administration feared that Iran's army might slice through Iraq to the oilfields of Kuwait and Saudi Arabia," as described by Judith Yaphe; Assistant Secretary of State for Near Eastern and South Asian Affairs Nicholas A. Veliotes "outlined a nightmare scenario in which the Iranians invade Iraq, they defeat Iraq, and then head straight for Israel, which is distracted and debilitated by its ongoing adventure in Lebanon." As a result, the U.S. gradually abandoned its policy of neutrality. Hiltermann says that the U.S. "began the tilt after Iraq, the aggressor in the war, was expelled from Iranian territory by a resurgent Iran, which then decided to pursue its own, fruitless version of regime change in Baghdad." In February 1982, Iraq was removed from the State Department's list of State Sponsors of Terrorism to ease the transfer of dual-use technology to that country. According to investigative journalist Alan Friedman, Haig was "upset at the fact that the decision had been made at the White House, even though the State Department was responsible for the list." "I was not consulted," Haig is said to have complained.

In March, President Reagan signed National Security Study Memorandum (NSSM) 4–82—seeking "a review of U.S. policy toward the Middle East"—and in June Reagan signed a National Security Decision Directive (NSDD) co-written by Teicher, who was now at the NSC, which determined: "The United States could not afford to allow Iraq to lose the war to Iran." Pursuant to this Directive, Thomas Twetten arrived in Baghdad on July 27 to share CIA satellite imagery on Iranian troop movements with the Iraqi Mukhabarat. This was "the first U.S. provision of intelligence to Iraq," and sparked a short-lived debate over whether Iraq would tolerate a CIA presence in the country: Mukhabarat head Barzan Tikriti told Twetten to "get the hell out of Iraq," but Iraqi military intelligence—"having already drooled over it and having said repeatedly how valuable it was"—subsequently informed Twetten "we'll continue to look at your information, and we'll assess whether it is of use to us in any way." The US government supplied Iraq with satellite photos showing Iranian deployments, which were later deemed to be misleading intelligence information designed to prolong the war with Iran and increase US influence in the region, contributing to the Iraqi defeat in the First Battle of al-Faw in February 1986.

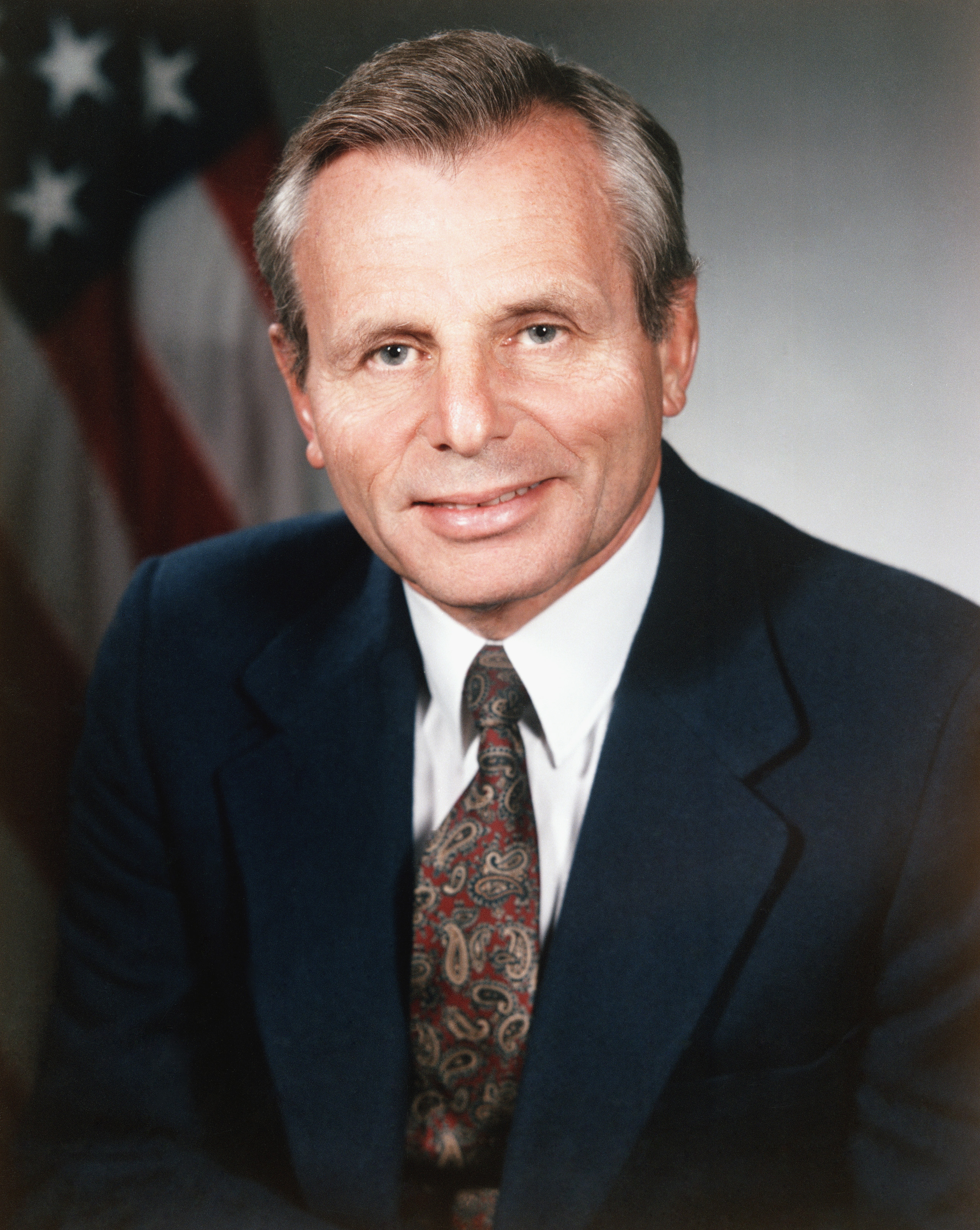
After reading the CIA report President Reagan wrote a note in the margin addressed to Secretary of Defense Frank Carlucci: "An Iranian victory is unacceptable."

Reports of Iraq's use of chemical weapons against Iran reached the CIA as early as 1983, but the U.S. took no action to restrain Iraq's violations of international law. The Reagan administration failed even to alert the UN. During the time Iran was publicly alleging that illegal chemical attacks were carried out on its forces and was tried to build a case to present to the UN. By November 1983, the State Department had been briefed on Iraq's "almost daily use of [chemical weapons]".

=== Normalization of relations and covert support ===
Donald Rumsfeld meets Saddam Hussein on December 19–20, 1983.

In late 1983, Reagan selected Donald Rumsfeld as his envoy to the Middle East; Rumsfeld met Saddam in Baghdad in December 1983 and March 1984. "On November 26, 1984, Iraq and the U.S. restored diplomatic relations." The U.S. reportedly sought to normalize relations with Iraq in late 1983, but Saddam did not agree until 1984. Rumsfeld visited again on March 24, 1984, the day the UN reported that Iraq had used mustard gas and tabun nerve agent against Iranian troops. The NY Times reported from Baghdad on March 29, 1984, that "American diplomats pronounce themselves satisfied with Iraq and the U.S., and suggest that normal diplomatic ties have been established in all but name."

According to Teicher's 1995 affidavit and separate interviews with former Reagan and Bush administration officials, the CIA secretly directed armaments and hi-tech components to Iraq through false fronts and friendly third parties such as Jordan, Saudi Arabia, Egypt and Kuwait, and they quietly encouraged rogue arms dealers and other private military companies to do the same:

[T]he United States actively supported the Iraqi war effort by supplying the Iraqis with billions of dollars of credits, by providing U.S. military intelligence and advice to the Iraqis, and by closely monitoring third-country arms sales to Iraq to make sure that Iraq had the military weaponry required. The United States also provided strategic operational advice to the Iraqis to better use their assets in combat ... The CIA, including both CIA Director Casey and Deputy Director Gates, knew of, approved of, and assisted in the sale of non-U.S. origin military weapons, ammunition and vehicles to Iraq. My notes, memoranda and other documents in my NSC files show or tend to show that the CIA knew of, approved of, and assisted in the sale of non-U.S. origin military weapons, munitions and vehicles to Iraq.

The full extent of these covert transfers is not yet known. Teicher's files on the subject are held securely at the Ronald Reagan Presidential Library and many other Reagan-era documents that could help shine new light on the subject remain classified. Teicher would also, under threat of a grand jury indictment for possibly violating his national security oath due to his disclosures, sign an affidavit retracting everything he had said.

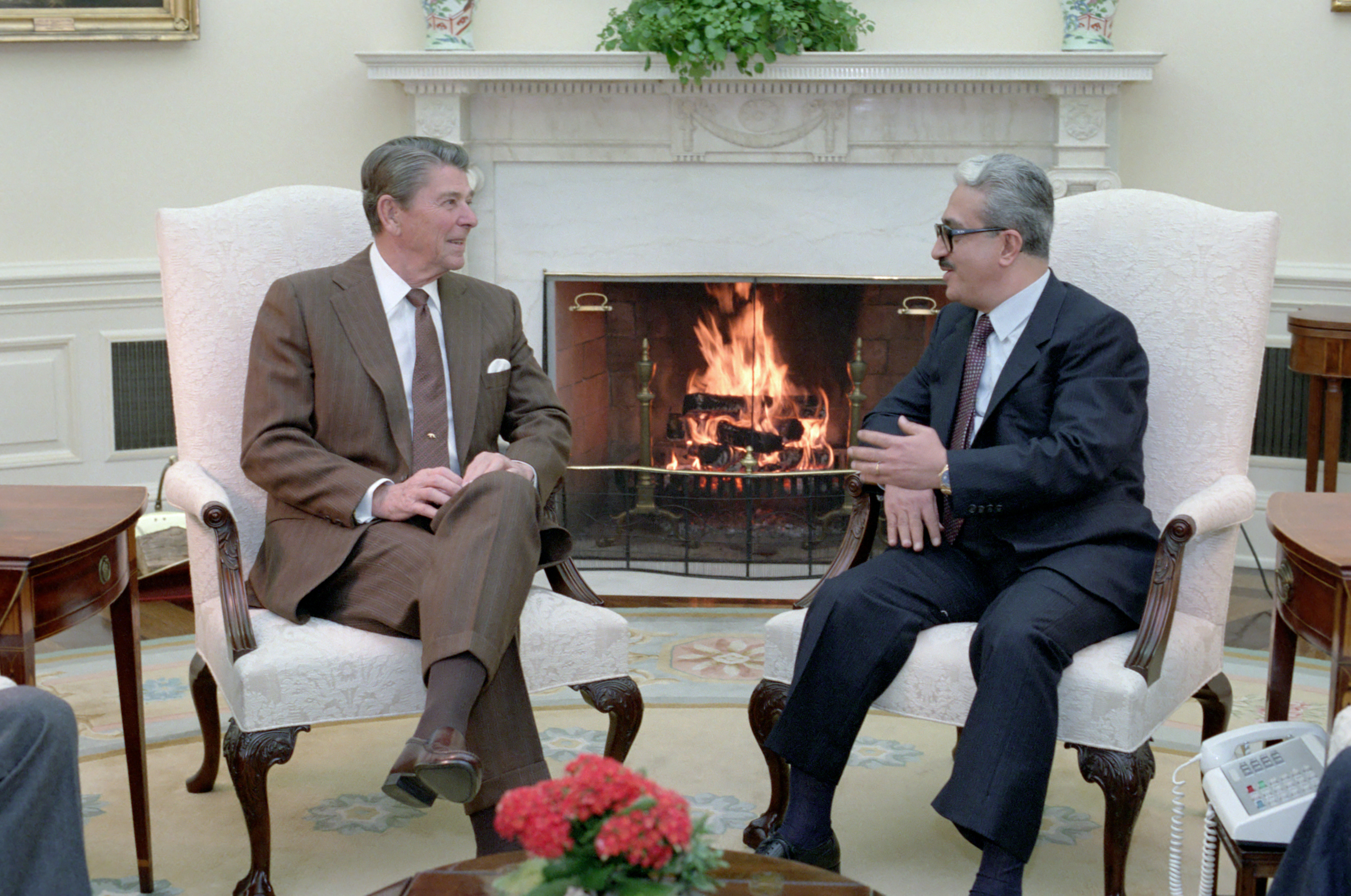
Ronald Reagan hosts then-Iraqi foreign minister Tariq Aziz of the Saddam Hussein administration at the White House, 1984

About two of every seven licenses for the export of "dual use" technology items approved between 1985 and 1990 by the U.S. Department of Commerce "went either directly to the Iraqi armed forces, to Iraqi end-users engaged in weapons production, or to Iraqi enterprises suspected of diverting technology" to weapons of mass destruction, according to an investigation by House Banking Committee Chairman Henry B. Gonzalez. Confidential Commerce Department files also reveal that the Reagan and Bush administrations approved at least 80 direct exports to the Iraqi military. These included computers, communications equipment, aircraft navigation and radar equipment.

In conformance with the Presidential directive, the U.S. began providing tactical battlefield advice to the Iraqi Army. "The prevailing view", says Alan Friedman, "was that if Washington wanted to prevent an Iranian victory, it would have to share some of its more sensitive intelligence photography with Saddam."

At times, thanks to the White House's secret backing for the intelligence-sharing, U.S. intelligence officers were actually sent to Baghdad to help interpret the satellite information. As the White House took an increasingly active role in secretly helping Saddam direct his armed forces, the United States even built an expensive high-tech annex in Baghdad to provide a direct down-link receiver for the satellite intelligence and better processing of the information ...

The American military commitment that had begun with intelligence-sharing expanded rapidly and surreptitiously throughout the Iran–Iraq War. A former White House official explained that "by 1987, our people were actually providing tactical military advice to the Iraqis in the battlefield, and sometimes they would find themselves over the Iranian border, alongside Iraqi troops."

Iraq used this data to target Iranian positions with chemical weapons, says ambassador Galbraith.

The MK-84: Saudi Arabia transferred to Iraq hundreds of U.S.-made general-purpose "dumb bombs".

According to retired Army Colonel W. Patrick Lang, senior defense intelligence officer for the United States Defense Intelligence Agency at the time, "the use of gas on the battlefield by the Iraqis was not a matter of deep strategic concern" to Reagan and his aides, because they "were desperate to make sure that Iraq did not lose." Lang disclosed that more than 60 officers of the Defense Intelligence Agency were secretly providing detailed information on Iranian deployments. He cautioned that the DIA "would have never accepted the use of chemical weapons against civilians, but the use against military objectives was seen as inevitable in the Iraqi struggle for survival." The Reagan administration did not stop aiding Iraq after receiving reports affirming the use of poison gas on Kurdish civilians.

Hiltermann says that when the Iraqi military turned its chemical weapons on the Kurds during the war, killing approximately 5,000 people in the town of Halabja and injuring thousands more, the Reagan administration sought to obscure Iraqi leadership culpability by suggesting, inaccurately, that the Iranians were partially responsible for the attack.

=== Forms of U.S. support ===
==== Bear Spares ====
With the UN-imposed embargo on warring parties, and with the Soviet Union opposing the conflict, Iraqi engineers found it increasingly difficult to repair and replace hardware damaged in battle. According to Kenneth R. Timmerman, "Saddam did foresee one immediate consequence of his invasion of Iran: the suspension of arms supplies from the USSR."

When he launched his attack, the Soviets were busy playing games in Iran. They were not amused that the Iraqis upset their plans. For generations the KGB had been working to penetrate Iran's Shiite clergy. In February 1979, when Ayatollah Khomeini took power and threw the Americans out of Iran, the Soviets stood to gain more than they had ever believed possible. ... KGB boss Yuri Andropov [had] little difficulty in convincing Brezhnev and Kosygin to agree to an embargo on arms to Iraq ... ^{p. 83-84}

According to Howard Teicher, the United States assisted Iraq through a military aid program known as "Bear Spares", whereby the U.S. military "made sure that spare parts and ammunition for Soviet or Soviet-style weaponry were available to countries which sought to reduce their dependence on the Soviets for defense needs." According to Teicher's 1995 court affidavit:

If the "Bear Spares" were manufactured outside the United States, then the U.S. could arrange for the provision of these weapons to a third country without direct involvement. Israel, for example, had a very large stockpile of Soviet weaponry and ammunition captured during its various wars. At the suggestion of the United States, the Israelis would transfer the spare parts and weapons to third countries ... Similarly, Egypt manufactured weapons and spare parts from Soviet designs and provided these weapons and ammunition to the Iraqis and other countries.

==== Dual-use exports ====
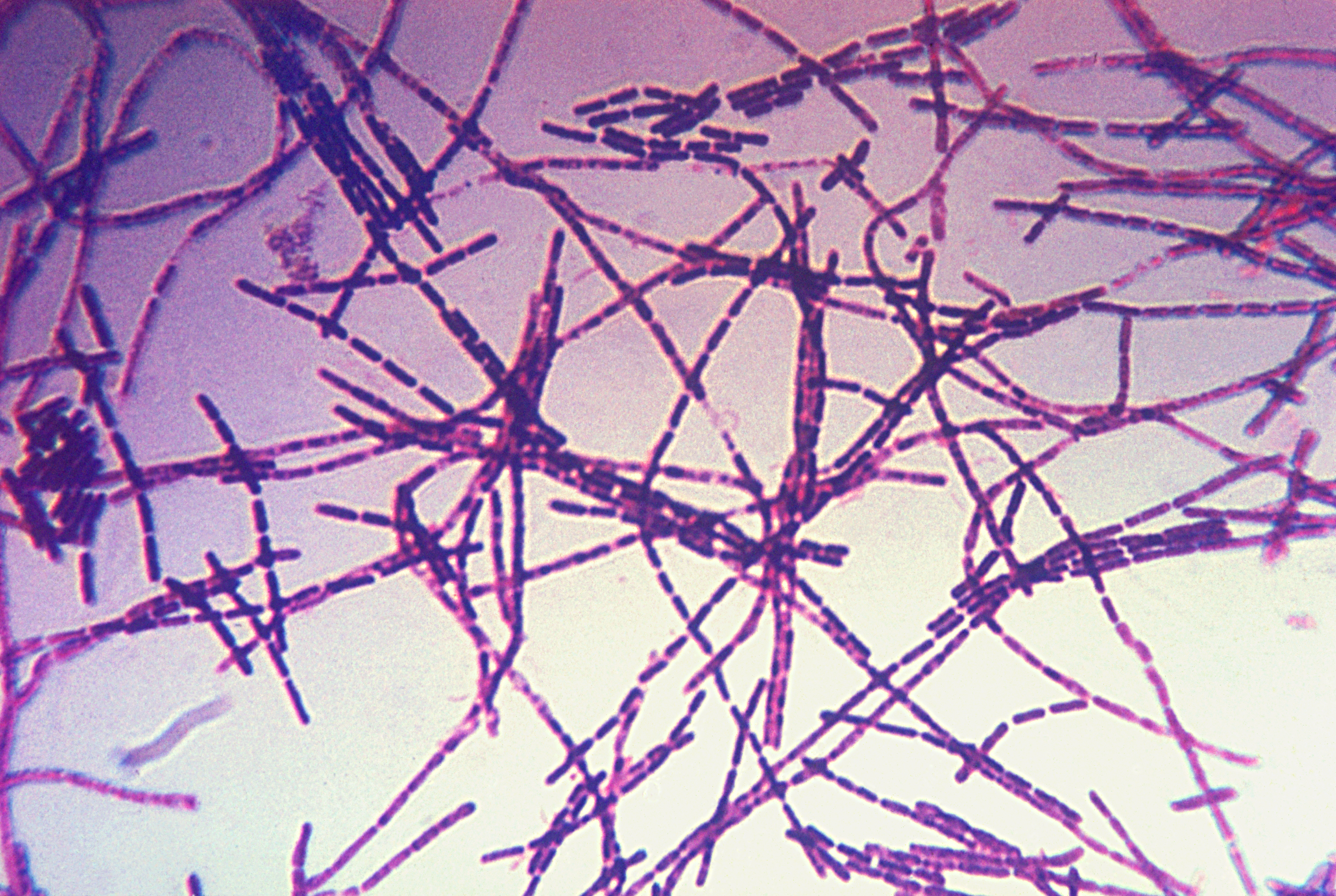
Iraq purchased 8 strains of anthrax from the United States in 1985, according to British biological weapons expert David Kelly. The Iraqi military settled on the American Type Culture Collection strain 14578 as the exclusive strain for use as a biological weapon, according to Charles Duelfer.

On February 9, 1994, Senator Riegle delivered a report—commonly known as the Riegle Report—in which it was stated that "pathogenic (meaning 'disease producing'), toxigenic (meaning 'poisonous'), and other biological research materials were exported to Iraq pursuant to application and licensing by the U.S. Department of Commerce." It added: "These exported biological materials were not attenuated or weakened and were capable of reproduction." The report then detailed 70 shipments (including anthrax) from the United States to Iraqi government agencies over three years, concluding "It was later learned that these microorganisms exported by the United States were identical to those the UN inspectors found and recovered from the Iraqi biological warfare program."

Donald Riegle, Chairman of the Senate committee that authored the aforementioned Riegle Report, said:

U.N. inspectors had identified many United States manufactured items that had been exported from the United States to Iraq under licenses issued by the Department of Commerce, and [established] that these items were used to further Iraq's chemical and nuclear weapons development and its missile delivery system development programs. ... The executive branch of our government approved 771 different export licenses for sale of dual-use technology to Iraq. I think that is a devastating record.

The U.S. Centers for Disease Control sent Iraq 14 separate agents "with biological warfare significance," according to Riegle's investigators.

==== Combat planning and battlefield intelligence ====
More than 60 US Defense Intelligence Agency officers provided combat planning assistance, and the US also provided battlefield intelligence including satellite pictures to Saddam Hussein's military.

==== Diplomatic support ====
In 1984, Iran introduced a draft resolution to the United Nations Security Council, citing the Geneva Protocol of 1925, condemning Iraq's use of chemical weapons on the battlefield. In response, the United States instructed its delegate at the UN to lobby friendly representatives in support of a motion to take "no decision" on the use of chemical munitions by Iraq. If backing to obstruct the resolution could be won, then the U.S. delegation was to proceed and vote in favor of taking zero action; if support were not forthcoming, the U.S. delegate was to refrain from voting altogether.

USDEL should work to develop general Western position in support of a motion to take "no decision" on Iranian draft resolution on use of chemical weapons by Iraq. If such a motion gets reasonable and broad support and sponsorship, USDEL should vote in favor. Failing Western support for "no decision," USDEL should abstain.

Representatives of the United States argued that the UN Human Rights Commission was an "inappropriate forum" for consideration of such abuses. According to Joyce Battle, the Security Council eventually issued a "presidential statement" condemning the use of unconventional weapons "without naming Iraq as the offending party." In 1988, Iraqi Foreign Minister Tariq Aziz acknowledged Iraq's use of chemical weapons against Iran, but claimed that Iran had used them against Iraq first.

== Parties involved ==
According to Russ Baker, writing in the Columbia Journalism Review, a "vast network" based in the U.S. and elsewhere, fed Iraq's warring capabilities right up until August 1990, when Saddam invaded Kuwait.

=== Sarkis Soghanalian ===
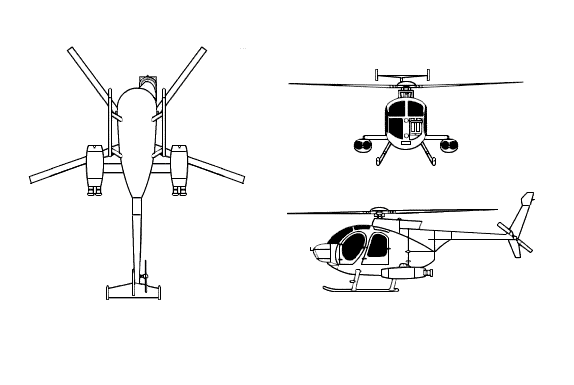
MD 500 Defender: Iraq acquired 60 multi-role military helicopters directly from the United States in 1983. Additional helicopter sales prompted congressional opposition, forcing the Reagan administration to explore alternative ways of assisting Saddam.

Alan Friedman writes that Sarkis Soghanalian, one of the most notorious arms dealers during the Cold War, procured Eastern Bloc and French origin weaponry, and brokered vast deals with Iraq, with the tacit approval of the Central Intelligence Agency.

The most prominent [arms merchant] was Sarkis Soghanalian, a Miami-based former CIA contractor who brokered tens of billions of dollars' worth of military hardware for Iraq during the 1980s, reporting many of his transactions to officials in Washington. [Soghanalian] was close to the Iraqi leadership and to intelligence officers and others in the Reagan administration. In many respects he was the living embodiment of plausible deniability, serving as a key conduit for CIA and other U.S. government operations.^{p. 36}

In an interview with William Kistner, Soghanalian stated that he was "working closely with the U.S. government". According to Timmerman, Soghanalian also helped the Iraqis obtain TOW anti-tank missiles, for which he was later prosecuted by the United States Department of Justice.

=== Banca Nazionale del Lavoro ===
The "Iraqgate" scandal revealed that a branch of Italy's smallest bank, Banca Nazionale del Lavoro (BNL), in Atlanta, Georgia relied partially on U.S. government-guaranteed loans to funnel $5 billion to Iraq from 1985 to 1989. In August 1989, when FBI agents raided the Atlanta branch of BNL, branch manager Christopher Drogoul was charged with making unauthorized, clandestine, and illegal loans to Iraq – some of which, according to his indictment, were used to purchase arms and weapons technology. According to classified U.S. government documents obtained by the Los Angeles Times, several federal agencies "issued warnings of serious irregularities with the program," including that the loan guarantees allowed Iraq to purchase arms. "Iraqi officials ... acknowledged that the Department of Agriculture funds had been diverted for military purposes," however "evidence of improprieties was largely ignored." George H. W. Bush, "first as vice president and then as President, intervened repeatedly over a period of almost a decade to obtain special assistance for Saddam Hussein—financial aid as well as access to high-tech equipment that was critical to Iraq's quest for nuclear and chemical arms." As late as October 1989, President Bush authorized $1 billion in loan guarantees to Iraq, although this was reduced to $400 million after several senior Iraqi officials were implicated in the BNL scandal. An investigation by the Clinton administration concluded "We did not find evidence that U.S. agencies or officials illegally armed Iraq or that crimes were committed through bartering of [U.S. agricultural] commodities for military equipment".

According to the Financial Times, the companies involved in the scandal by shipping militarily useful technology to Iraq were Hewlett-Packard, Tektronix, and Matrix Churchill's Ohio branch.

Even before the Persian Gulf War started in 1990, the Intelligencer Journal of Pennsylvania in a string of articles reported: "If U.S. and Iraqi troops engage in combat in the Persian Gulf, weapons technology developed in Lancaster and indirectly sold to Iraq will probably be used against U.S. forces ... And aiding in this ... technology transfer was the Iraqi-owned, British-based precision tooling firm Matrix Churchill, whose U.S. operations in Ohio were recently linked to a sophisticated Iraqi weapons procurement network."

"One entire facility, a tungsten-carbide manufacturing plant that was part of the Al Atheer complex," Kenneth Timmerman informed the Senate Committee on Banking, Housing, and Urban Affairs, "was blown up by the IAEA in April 1992 because it lay at the heart of the Iraqi clandestine nuclear weapons program, PC-3. Equipment for this plant appears to have been supplied by the Latrobe, Pennsylvania manufacturer, Kennametal, and by a large number of other American companies, with financing provided by the Atlanta branch of the BNL bank."

Aside from the New York Times, the Los Angeles Times, and ABC's Ted Koppel, the Iraq-gate story never picked up much momentum, even though the U.S. Congress became involved with the scandal. See an article by journalist William Safire, introduced into the Congressional Record by Rep. Tom Lantos.

By contrast, Alcolac International, a Maryland company, transported thiodiglycol, a mustard gas precursor, to Iraq. Alcolac was successfully prosecuted for its violations of export control law.

=== Index of American companies ===
According to German daily newspaper Die Tageszeitung, which is reported to have reviewed an uncensored copy of Iraq's 11,000-page declaration to the U.N. Security Council in 2002, almost 150 foreign companies supported Saddam Hussein's WMD program. Twenty-four U.S. firms were involved in exporting materials to Baghdad. An even longer list of American companies and their involvements in Iraq was provided by the LA Weekly in May 2003.

== Energy development and security ==
=== Aqaba pipeline project ===
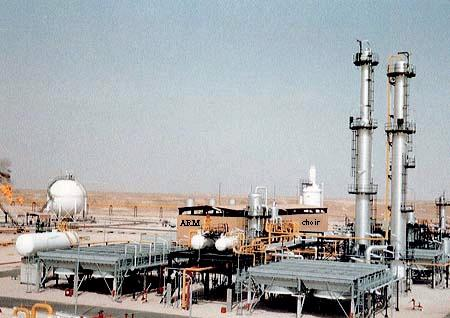

The United States government supported the construction of a new oil pipeline that would run westward from Iraq across the land to the Jordanian port city of Aqaba, permitting access from the Red Sea. The Bechtel Corporation was the prime contractor for this project. Donald Rumsfeld discussed the advantages of the pipeline personally with Saddam Hussein in 1983. The Aqaba project never made it past the drawing board, however, because of its proximity to Israel, which planners insisted upon. So near to the border it would run, the Iraqi leadership feared the Israeli side could disable the pipeline at a later date, simply by "lobbing a few hand grenades" at it.

=== Tanker War and U.S. military involvement ===
The Tanker War started when Iraq attacked Iranian tankers and the oil terminal at Kharg island in 1984. Iran struck back by attacking tankers carrying Iraqi oil from Kuwait and then any tanker of the Persian Gulf states supporting Iraq. Both nations attacked oil tankers and merchant ships, including those of neutral nations, in an effort to deprive the opponent of trade. After repeated Iraqi attacks on Iran's main exporting facility on Khark Island, Iran attacked a Kuwaiti tanker near Bahrain on May 13, 1984, and a Saudi tanker in Saudi waters on May 16. Attacks on ships of noncombatant nations in the Persian Gulf sharply increased thereafter, and this phase of the war was dubbed the "Tanker War."

Lloyd's of London, a British insurance market, estimated that the Tanker War damaged 546 commercial vessels and killed about 430 civilian mariners. The largest of attacks were directed by Iran against Kuwaiti vessels, and on November 1, 1986, Kuwait formally petitioned foreign powers to protect its shipping. The Soviet Union agreed to charter tankers starting in 1987, and the United States Navy offered to provide protection for tankers flying the U.S. flag on March 7, 1987. Operation Prime Chance was a United States Special Operations Command operation intended to protect U.S.-flagged oil tankers from Iranian attack. The operation took place roughly at the same time as Operation Earnest Will, the largely Navy effort to escort the tankers through the Persian Gulf.

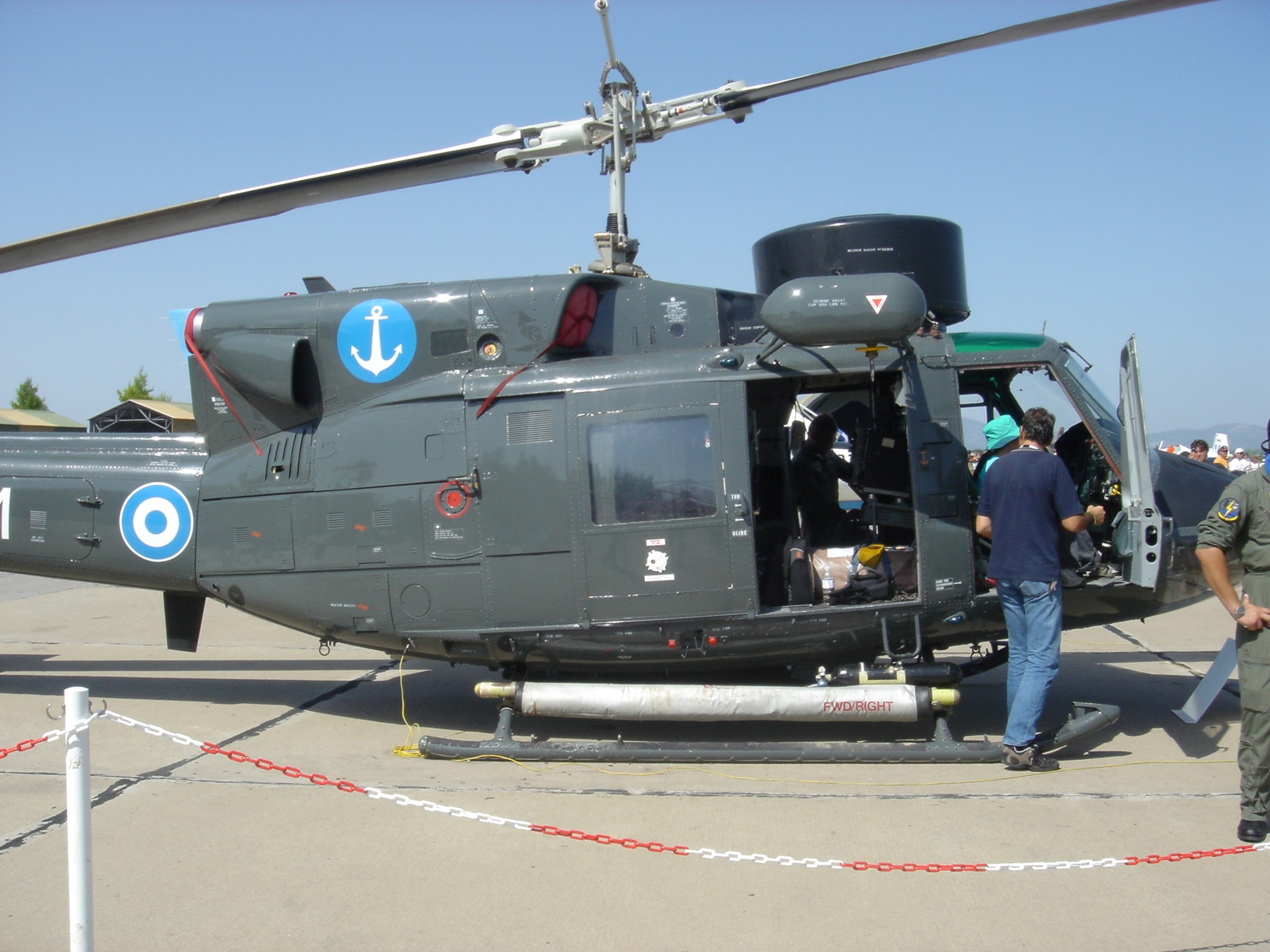
Agusta-Bell 212 ASW: The Italian subsidiary of Bell Textron sold Iraq military helicopters fitted out for anti-submarine warfare. This deal needed, and duly received, government approval.

Under international law, an attack on such ships would be treated as an attack on the U.S., allowing the U.S. to retaliate militarily. This support would protect ships headed to Iraqi ports, effectively guaranteeing Iraq's revenue stream for the duration of the war.

Special Operations Forces also assisted in this effort. The 160th Special Operations Aviation Regiment operated AH-6 helicopters from a large barge anchored at sea. A second platform was flown by Special Forces from Fort Bragg, piloting OH-58Ds. "These things looked extremely sinister. They were all black and bristling with antennas and had a huge round sight module about two feet in diameter stuck on a mast above the rotor blades. ... The impression you got, just looking at one of these things on the ground, was of a giant insect staring at you before you die", a Special Forces officer is quoted as saying.

On April 14, 1988, the frigate USS Samuel B. Roberts was badly damaged by an Iranian mine. U.S. forces responded with Operation Praying Mantis on April 18, the United States Navy's largest engagement of surface warships since World War II. Two Iranian ships were destroyed, killing 55 sailors in the process, and an American helicopter was shot down, killing the two pilots.

A number of researchers and former military personnel contend that the United States carried out Black operations against Iranian military targets during the war. Lt. Col. Roger Charles, who worked in the Office of the Secretary of Defense at the Pentagon, says the Navy used specially equipped Mark III patrol boats during the night, with the intent of luring Iranian gunboats away from territorial waters, where they could be fired upon and destroyed. "They took off at night and rigged up false running lights so that from a distance it would appear there was a merchant ship, which the Iranians would want to inspect."

Information collected from Operation Eager Glacier, a top-secret intelligence-gathering program, was also used to bomb manufacturing plants inside Iran by the CIA.

==== The USS Stark incident ====
An Iraqi jet fighter mistakenly attacked the USS Stark in May 1987, killing 37 servicemen and injuring 21. But attention in Washington was on isolating Iran; accepting Saddam's apology for the error, the White House criticized Iran's mining of international waters, and in October 1987, the U.S. attacked Iranian oil platforms in retaliation for an Iranian attack on the U.S.-flagged Kuwaiti tanker Sea Isle City.

==== Iran Air Flight 655 ====
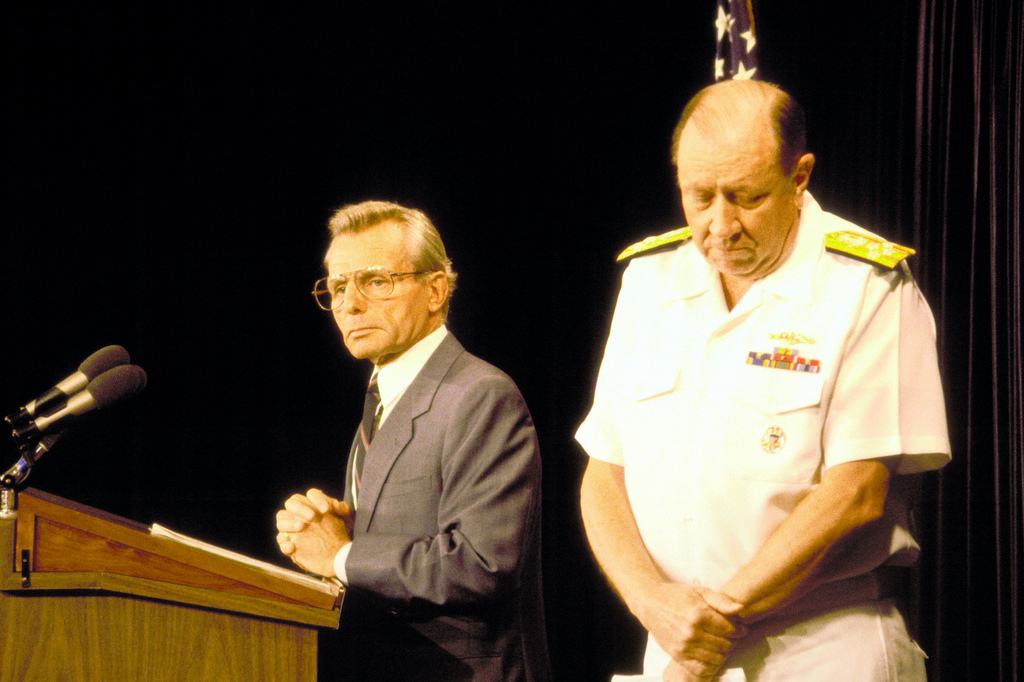
Defense Secretary Frank Carlucci and Admiral Crowe, then chairman of the Joint Chiefs of Staff

Iran Air Flight 655 was an international scheduled passenger flight from Tehran to Dubai via Bandar Abbas that was shot down on July 3, 1988, by two surface-to-air missiles fired by USS Vincennes, a U.S. Navy warship. The missiles hit the Iran Air aircraft, an Airbus A300, while it was flying its usual route over Iran's territorial waters in the Persian Gulf. All 290 people on board were killed, including 274 passengers and a crew of 16, making it one of the deadliest airliner shootdowns of all time and the deadliest in Iranian history.

Vincennes entered Iranian territorial waters after one of its helicopters drew warning fire from Iranian speedboats operating within Iranian territorial limits. The reason for the downing has been disputed between the governments of the two countries.

According to the U.S. government, Vincennes's crew misidentified the aircraft as an F-14 Tomcat, a U.S.-made fighter jet within Iran's inventory, despite it transmitting civilian identification codes. It asserts that Vincennes and other warships repeatedly contacted the aircraft on both civilian and military air distress frequencies, but received no response. By contrast, the Iranian government maintains that the U.S. recklessly shot down the aircraft, violating international law, after repeatedly provoking the Iranian forces. Some analysts blamed the overly aggressive attitude of Vincennes's captain, William C. Rogers III, while others focused on more widespread issues and miscommunications on board.

The United States was criticized for the downing, especially in its initial response. While not issuing a formal apology, President Reagan issued a written diplomatic note to Iran, expressing deep regret. In 1996, both governments reached a settlement in the International Court of Justice in which the U.S. agreed to pay US$61.8 million (equivalent to $127 million in 2025) on an ex gratia basis to the families of the victims. As part of the settlement, the U.S. did not admit liability for the shootdown.

=== Longer term interests ===
In response to further Iraqi chemical attacks on Kurdish civilians after the August 1988 ceasefire with Iran, U.S. senators Claiborne Pell and Jesse Helms called for comprehensive economic sanctions against Iraq, including an oil embargo and severe limitations on the export of dual-use technology. Although the ensuing legislation passed in the U.S. Senate, it faced strong opposition within the House of Representatives and did not become law. In a rare rebuke, Secretary of State George Shultz condemned Iraq's "unjustified and abhorrent" attacks, which Shultz's assistant Charles E. Redman characterized as "unacceptable to the civilized world." Even after these pronouncements, however, the State Department advised against sanctions.

In October 1989, President Bush signed NSD 26, which begins, "Access to Persian Gulf oil and the security of key friendly states in the area are vital to U.S. national security." With respect to Iraq, the directive stated, "Normal relations between the United States and Iraq would serve our longer term interests and promote stability in both the Persian Gulf and the Middle East."

== Public opinion ==
Shortly after the Iraqi invasion of Iran, an October 1980 ABC News poll found that 39% of Americans felt "more sympathy" for Iraq, compared to 11% for Iran. By 1984, this shifted slightly, with 44% sympathizing with Iraq and 12% with Iran. As the war progressed, a May 1987 poll by the Los Angeles Times showed that 30% of the U.S. population wanted Iraq to win the war, while 5% supported Iran. Following the beginning of direct U.S. involvement in the Tanker war, a September 1987 poll by The New York Times reported an increase, with 43% favoring an Iraqi victory compared to 5% for Iran.

== See also ==
- 1953 Iranian coup d'état
- 2025 United States strikes on Iranian nuclear sites
- 2026 Iran war
- Assassination of Qasem Soleimani
- CIA activities in Iran
- CIA activities in Iraq
- International aid to combatants in the Iran–Iraq War
- Iran Air Flight 655
- Iran–Contra affair
- Iran–Saudi Arabia proxy conflict
- Operation Staunch was created in spring 1983 by the United States State Department to stop the illicit flow of U.S. arms to Iran.
- Soviet support for Iraq during the Iran–Iraq war
- Italian support for Iraq during the Iran–Iraq war

== Sources ==
- Gasiorowski, Mark J. (Fall 2012). "US Intelligence Assistance to Iran, May–October 1979" (PDF). The Middle East Journal. 66 (4): 613–627. doi:10.3751/66.4.13. S2CID 144299252. Archived from the original (PDF) on September 9, 2016.
