= World Business =

- Genre: Business and political reportage, interviews
- Presented by: Raya Abirached
- Country of origin: United Kingdom
- Original language: English

Production
- Running time: 30 minutes

Original release
- Network: CNBC Europe
- Release: 2006 – July 2011

World Business is a weekly half hour features programme on CNBC presented by Raya Abirached, broadcast between 2006 and 2011. The show covers recent trends in global business, technology, luxury markets and the business of sport. The programme aired in Europe on Friday nights and in Asia on Saturday mornings.

World Business was cancelled after it was revealed that the show's production company was doubling as a public relations firm for Malaysian politicians, including Sarawak Chief Minister Abdul Taib Mahmud. The Sarawak Report, a blog run by Clare Rewcastle Brown, reported that FBC Media had been receiving payments from Malaysian politicians in return for positive coverage, including carrying puff pieces on the programme to improve Taib's international image.
