= Sarawak Report =

Investigative journalism website

- Screenshot Screenshot of the homepage as on 9 July 2016
- Website type: Blog; Opinion, commentary, political activism
- Available in: English, Iban, Malay and Mandarin
- Owner: Clare Rewcastle Brown
- Creator: Clare Rewcastle Brown
- Editor: Clare Rewcastle Brown
- Website: www.sarawakreport.org
- Commercial: No
- Registration: Optional (required to comment)
- Launched: 12 February 2010
- Current status: Active

Sarawak Report is an investigative journalism website focused on environmental and corruption issues in Malaysia. It has been largely self-published and operated from London since 2010 by Clare Rewcastle Brown. The blog had originally focused on the welfare of the indigenous people in Sarawak but eventually published original exposés on corruption scandals in wider Malaysia. In 2017, it gained wide recognition for its original and early exposure of the 1Malaysia Development Berhad scandal, which had led the Najib Razak-led Malaysian government to block the website. The blog was openly critical of the Barisan Nasional-led state and federal governments of Sarawak and Malaysia, and supportive of the Pakatan Harapan opposition.

== History ==
=== Founding ===
The sarawakreport.org domain name was registered on 12 February 2010. The website published its first post focusing on the rights of the indigenous people in the jungles of the Baram Region, Sarawak, Malaysia but eventually began to publish exposés on corruption scandals in Malaysia in general. On 15 June 2010, it published its first exposé on the Sarawak chief minister family's properties in Canada. The website was initially operated anonymously. It described itself as "a group of citizens and onlookers deeply concerned by the situation in Sarawak, East Malaysia." In November 2010, its sister organisation, a pirate radio operation named Radio Free Sarawak was formed. On 22 February 2011, Clare Rewcastle Brown decided to go public and to claim responsibility of the website after her American informant, Ross Boyert, was found dead in a Los Angeles hotel room. Since then, Clare Rewcastle became the founder, the editor-in-chief, and the spokesperson for Sarawak Report.

=== Purpose ===
According to the Sarawak Report website, it exists to provide a platform for those who denied access to the state-controlled media, and "to offer an alternative vision of justice, transparency and a fairer future."

=== Political stance ===
The blog is openly critical of the Barisan Nasional-led state and federal governments of Sarawak and Malaysia, and supportive of the Pakatan Harapan opposition.

== Original exposés ==
=== East Malaysian Environmental and Indigenous Causes ===
Sarawak Report published a chain of exposés of alleged land grabs by the family of Sarawak's chief minister Abdul Taib Mahmud and their international property empire.

==== Taib Mahmud family overseas property ====
In June 2010, Sarawak Report began its first exposé by publishing an article detailing about Canadian properties owned by the daughter, Jamilah Taib, of Taib Mahmud. This was followed by subsequent exposés on his properties in United States and London. Taib Mahmud's former aide, Ross Boyert was the major source for Sarawak Report on the Taib family property empire in the United States. Exposés by Sarawak Report have led to investigations by Germany, Switzerland, United Kingdom, and Canada into Taib family alleged assets.

==== Bakun Dam construction methods ====
In April 2011, Sarawak Report claimed that its website was hacked after it reported that Chinese dam constructor Sinohydro had used faulty construction methods when building the Bakun Dam, one of the largest dams in Asia. Sinohydro later acknowledged their flawed construction procedures in building the dam.

==== Musa Aman timber corruption ====
In April 2012, Sarawak Report published a series of leaked documents from Malaysian Anti-Corruption Commission (MACC), alleging the business relation between Musa Aman, who is the Sabah Chief Minister, and Michael Chia, the middleman in managing kickbacks for timber companies' operations inside Sungai Pinangah Forest Reserve, Sabah. Michael Chia was caught trying to smuggle SGD 16 million out of Hong Kong in 2008. Abdul Gani Patail, the Attorney General of Malaysia who is related to the Musa Aman family, was accused of trying to block the MACC investigation. Swiss authorities cooperated with their counterparts in Hong Kong in the investigation of the Musa Aman case. On 11 October 2012, in a written reply to the Parliament, Minister in the Prime Minister's Department Datuk Seri Nazri Aziz said Musa Aman has been cleared of the alleged RM40 million kickbacks for timber licences by the Attorney-General's Chambers as "the funds were contributions to the Sabah Umno liaison body and not for the personal use of the chief minister". The Malaysian Prime Minister, Najib Tun Razak, refused to disclose the source of the political donation but he insisted that the money was funded through legitimate channels. In response to the reply by Najib, Sarawak Report released another set of documents on 14 October which pointed the donors to Sabah and Sarawak timber tycoons. In April 2013, Reuters validated that the documents released by Sarawak Report as genuine. Two of the timber firms confirmed with Reuters that the money was transferred to secure the logging contracts. MACC officials also told Reuters that the documents are authentic and Musa Aman was the focus of the investigation.

=== Malaysian Corruption ===
==== FBC Media scandal ====
In August 2011, an investigation by Sarawak Report revealed that FBC Media, a media production company had been acting as a public relations firm for Malaysian politicians including Abdul Taib Mahmud and Najib Tun Razak. The exposé caused BBC and CNBC to sever their relationships with FBC Media, and resulted in FBC Media going into administration on 24 October 2011. The BBC later issued a worldwide apology and revised its commissioning procedures after the revelation that it had been commissioning programming from FBC at token prices, which the company had then used as a PR platform for its business and political clients.

==== 1Malaysia Development Berhad ====
In May 2014, Sarawak Report began to allege that 1Malaysia Development Berhad (1MDB) was backing Jho Low's company, Wynton Group, for a bid to purchase Maybourne Hotel Group in London. In August 2014, Red Granite Pictures admitted that its financial backer for film production was Aabar Investments where the latter had a strong investment ties with 1MDB. In March 2015, the website ran several reports about a strategic development fund supported by the Malaysian government and its business dealings. One such report was made about joint venture deal had been initiated by Jho Low on 8 September 2009 between 1MDB and PetroSaudi International, and how Jho Low allegedly siphoned off US$700 million from the deal into an account controlled by him. PetroSaudi has denied the reports, while 1MDB has denied any connections with Jho Low. Sarawak Report further alleges that the 1 billion loan paid by 1MDB to PetroSaudi has not been declared to Bank Negara Malaysia (BNM), the Malaysian central bank. 1MDB was also accused of providing false documents to Malaysian central bank and other international banks. The website also alleged that US$1.16 billion from 1MDB went into a company account, Good Star Limited controlled by Jho Low, US$700 million into the private AmBank account of Malaysian prime minister Najib Razak, and RM 2 million into prime minister's wife Rosmah Mansor personal account. Jho Low was also accused of paying for Rosmah's jewellery purchases. Najib has since denied that he had taken 1MDB funds for personal gain while Rosmah denied that she has misappropriated the funds from 1MDB. On 4 August 2015, Malaysian Anti-Corruption Commission (MACC) announced that the US$700 million was a political donation for United Malays National Organisation (UMNO) held in trust by Najib Razak. On 15 August 2015, Sarawak Report alleged that after the 2013 Malaysian General Election, US$650 million out of US$700 million in Najib's account was transferred back to Tanore Finance Corporation (BVI) at Falcon bank in Singapore when his account was closed on 30 August 2013. Tanore Corporation was later closed down in April 2014. The website also alleged that UMNO Back Bencher Chairman Shahrir Abdul Samad, received RM1 million while the Deputy Finance Minister Ahmad Maslan, received RM2 million from the Najib's private account.

In July 2016, Sarawak Report released details of the classified Auditor General's Report on 1MDB and the BNM letter to the Parliamentary Accounts Committee (PAC), highlighting the inconsistencies of explanations and documents provided by 1MDB.

On 6 August 2016, Sarawak Report alleged that Malaysian Islamic Party (PAS) received RM 90 million from Najib. In April 2017, PAS president Abdul Hadi Awang decided to file a defamation lawsuit against Sarawak Report. In April 2018, Sarawak Report further alleged that PAS received RM 2.5 million from UMNO on 21 March 2018. PAS admitted that they have received the RM 2.5 million but they refused to disclose the source of donation. In May 2018, Hadi Awang's lawyer claimed that he had won all five interlocutory applications in libel suit against Sarawak Report and Sarawak Report had to pay £28,900 for Hadi's legal costs. However, Sarawak Report debunked the Hadi's lawyer statement that the payment was necessary for the costs accrued due to revision of defence and the full trial will be heard from 1 April 2019 to 10 April 2019 for total ten days. On 2 February 2019, PAS president Abdul Hadi Awang agreed on an out-of-court settlement with Sarawak Report.

Riza Aziz and Red Granite Pictures

In December 2013, Sarawak Report ran a series of exposés on Riza Aziz, stepson of Prime Minister Najib Razak, and how he managed to get millions in funding for his film production company Red Granite Pictures. The production company was involved with funding the Oscar nominated movie, The Wolf of Wall Street to the tune of US$100 million. Also reported was Aziz's purchase of a US$33.5 million luxury condominium in New York City in November 2012. Red Granite Pictures has threatened legal action against Sarawak Report, but no action has been taken so far. In January 2014, Riza Aziz was dropped from a list of nominees for Academy Award for Best Picture after he was nominated by Producers Guild of America (PGA) for the movie Wolf of the Wall Street.

== Reception ==
Sarawak Report has received both praise and criticism. In 2013, Bridget Welsh, a political science professor at Singapore Management University and an expert on Malaysian affairs, credited Sarawak Report for its "impact on the political debate" over deforestation in Sarawak. and the New York Times called Rewcastle Brown "one of the most effective voices calling attention to deforestation in Malaysia". The Open Society Foundation acknowledged that websites like Sarawak Report have been able to "disseminate news on alleged state government corruption to rural areas that are hard to reach" but described the nature of Sarawak Report's reporting as "half-sensational, half-revelatory," making verification an issue.

=== Censorship in Malaysia ===
On 19 July 2015, Malaysian Communications and Multimedia Commission (MCMC) decided to block access to Sarawak Report because the content of the website appears to be "unsubstantiated" and it may "undermined the stability" of the country. Sarawak Report continued to reach the Malaysian public through Medium.com, but that was also blocked in January 2016. On 15 May 2018, six days after the 2018 Malaysian general election where the ruling Barisan Nasional was defeated and the Pakatan Harapan came to power, the 1MDB Auditor General's Report was declassified. Following this, MCMC decided to unblock Sarawak Report and Medium.com on 18 May 2018.
