= Capture of Siniawan (1836) =

- Part of the Sarawak Uprising of 1836
Date	2 July 1836; 190 years ago
Location	Siniawan
Result	Sarawakian Rebel victory

Belligerents
Rebels	Bruneian Empire

Commanders and leaders
Datu Patinggi Ali	Pengiran Indera Mahkota; Pengiran Muda Hashim

Strength
Unknown	20–60 men

Casualties and losses
Light	Unknown

The capture of Siniawan occurred during the Sarawak Uprising of 1836 on 2 July 1836 and was the second major military action between the Bruneian and Sarawakian armies during the Sarawak Uprising.

== Background ==
After the disastrous defeat of the Bruneians at the Battle of Lidah Tanah. Datu Patinggi Ali was likely embolden and began to target Siniawan. Siniawan was an important objective because was located upriver near Bau, was a major mining and trading settlement and controlled access between the interior and Kuching. By taking Siniawan, the rebels gained full control of the upper Sarawak River.

== Rebel advance ==
The rebels began advancing to Siniawan a month after the siege, which Mahkota had fortified Siniawan probably made during the march and assault on Lidah Tanah.

The rebels were made up of Sarawakian Malay militias and Bidayuh warriors who would have firearms, ammunition and cannons from the Sultanate of Sambas.

== Bruneian garrison ==
The garrison was made up of Malays and Dayaks warriors, with the latter being told earlier to reinforce the settlement by Mahkota. It is not known what exactly were the garrison was armed with but it is most probably the basic and traditional arms of the time.

=== Fortifications ===
The fortifications of Siniawan were made from heavy timber walls that surrounded the main settlement. Logs were often sharpened at the top to deter climbing, with the walls typically 2–3 m (6 ft 7 in – 9 ft 10 in) high. Wooden towers for lookouts to monitor river approaches which allowed early warning of upriver movements.

On the river, obstacles along the Sarawak River to slow boats. And possibly bamboo or wooden stakes in the river to impede attackers. Along side the mentioned small artillery or swivel guns could be mounted on the riverbank.

The main entry points were also limited to dissuade attackers and heavily guarded. Narrow access routes allowed defenders to concentrate fire on attackers. Secondary walls or barricades within the town for fallback positions somewhat similar to the walls of Constantinople and also allowed defenders to continue resistance even if the outer walls were breached by the attackers.

== Battle ==
Ali took advantage of the defeat at Lidah Tanah with the garrison being outnumbered by the rebels made victory likely. With the rebels leveraged knowledge of local terrain, The fort’s riverbank and elevated defenses slowed but did not stop the rebels and Ali likely commanded the rebels to conduct coordinated assaults from multiple directions stressing manpower even more. Brunei defenders abandoned the fort rather than face possible defeat and capture.

=== Aftermath ===
The defeat was caused due to numerical disadvantage and cluelessness of the terrain by the defenders and the rebels using tactics similar to that deployed by Native Americans and the French during the French and Indian War. The rebels temporarily halted their advance until late 1835, when they marched on to Bau, to take it from the Bruneians.
