= Military of historic Sarawak =

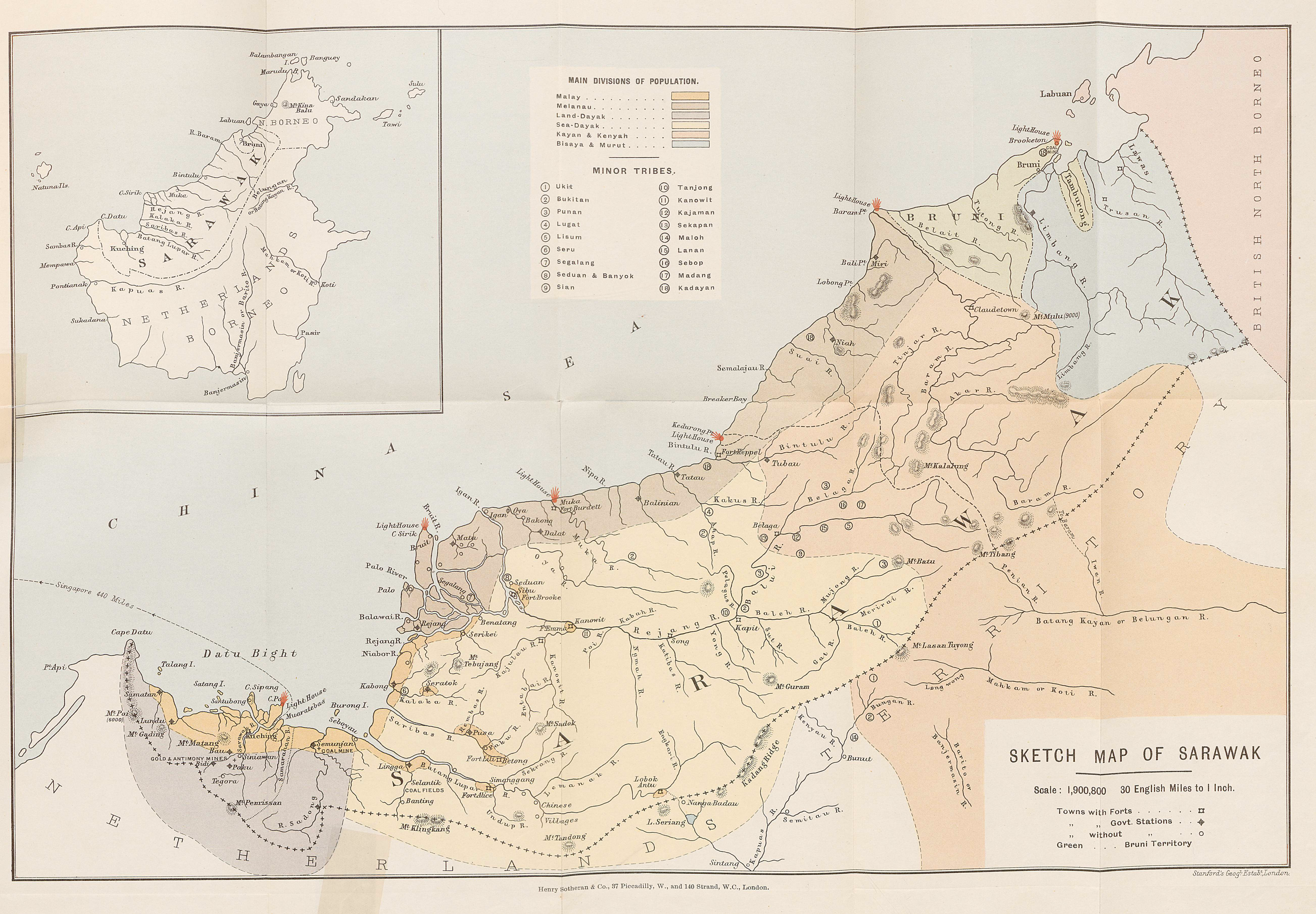
- Sketch Map of Sarawak in 1908
- Active: 1599–1946
- Disbanded: 1946
- Country: Sultanate of Sarawak; Province of Santubong; Province of Lidah Tanah; Province of Kuching; Kingdom of Sarawak
- Allegiance: Sultan Tengah; House of Bolkiah; Datu Patinggi Ali; House of Digadong; House of Brooke
- Type: army
- Role: Military force (until 1946)
- Size: Varies
- Mottos: Kingdom of Sarawak; Dum Spiro Spero (While I breathe, I hope)
- Colours: Yellow
- Equipment: Many primarily Parang
- Engagements: Sultanate of Sarawak: Dutch invasion of Matan (likely); Sarawakian provinces: Local rebellions Tribal feuds Pacification of Lanun; Sarawak Uprising of 1836; Kingdom of Sarawak: Anglo-Bruneian War; World War II

Commanders
- Main Commander: Sultan of Sarawak (until 1641); Datu Patinggi of Sarawak (until 1854); House of Digadong (until 1828); Brunei Pengirans (from 1827); White Rajah of Sarawak
- Provincial Rulers: Local chiefs
- Notable commanders: Sultan Tengah; Datu Patinggi Ali; James Brooke; Datu Patinggi Abdul Gapur; Pengiran Muda Hashim

The term "Military of historic Sarawak" is a wide term to refer to Sarawak between 1599 and 1946.

== History ==
=== Sultanate of Sarawak (1599–1641) ===
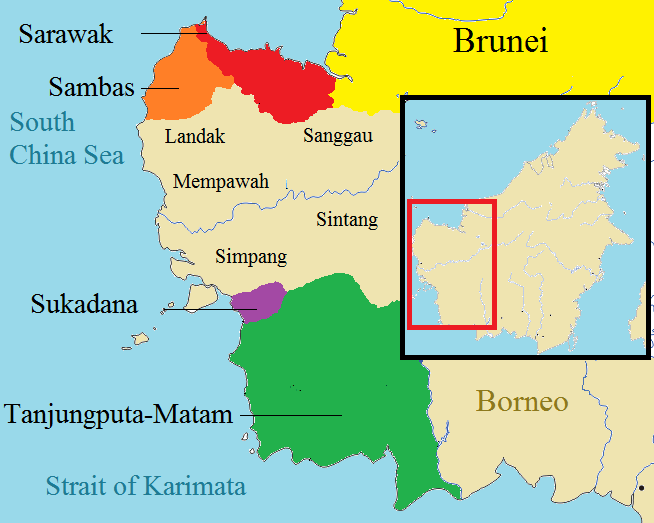
The polity of western Borneo, 17th century, with Sarawak in Red. The kingdoms that established close relationship with Sarawak are illustrated in colour, while other neighbouring kingdoms are represented in light brown.

To prevent a war between Abdul Jalilul Akbar and his brother Ibrahim Ali Omar Shah, Abdul Jalilul Akbar created Sarawak to make his brother Ibrahim as far away from the capital, proclaiming Ibrahim as Sultan of Sarawak in 1599. After the establishment of the Sultan Tengah constructed a fortified palace in Sungai Bedil, modern day Kuching in 1599, turning the area into the royal, judicial and administrate capital of the kingdom.

Heading off for Sarawak, Sultan Ibrahim Ali Omar Shah took a total of one thousand men (Brunei people who reside in Kampong Saba) with him. These troops are made up of Sakai, Kedayan, and Bunut, three natives of Sarawak. Not only that, but he was also joined by Brunei's royal kin, who helped Sarawak establish a government. The Sarawak sultanate's administrative hub was decided to be in the Santubong region, with this decision, Sultan Tengah constructed a fortified palace in Sungai Bedil, modern day Kuching in 1599, turning the area into the royal, judicial and administrate capital of the kingdom. According to the Diraja Sambas account, the Sultan identified himself as Sultan Ibrahim Ali Omar Shah or Sultan Abdul Jalil.

Tengah also made large formal political unions amongst the Matan and Sambas kingdoms, with Sarawak likely had involvement with the Mataram invasion of Matan in 1622, as he only left Matan in either 1630, 1638 or 1641, although some sources conflict with this with him only landing in Matan in 1631 and stay there for seven years. He was soon struck by a Sakai (Note: Sakai in this context refers to Dayaks.) with a broken harpoon as he paused to relief himself at Kampung Batu Buaya.

=== Sarawakian provinces (1641–1841) ===
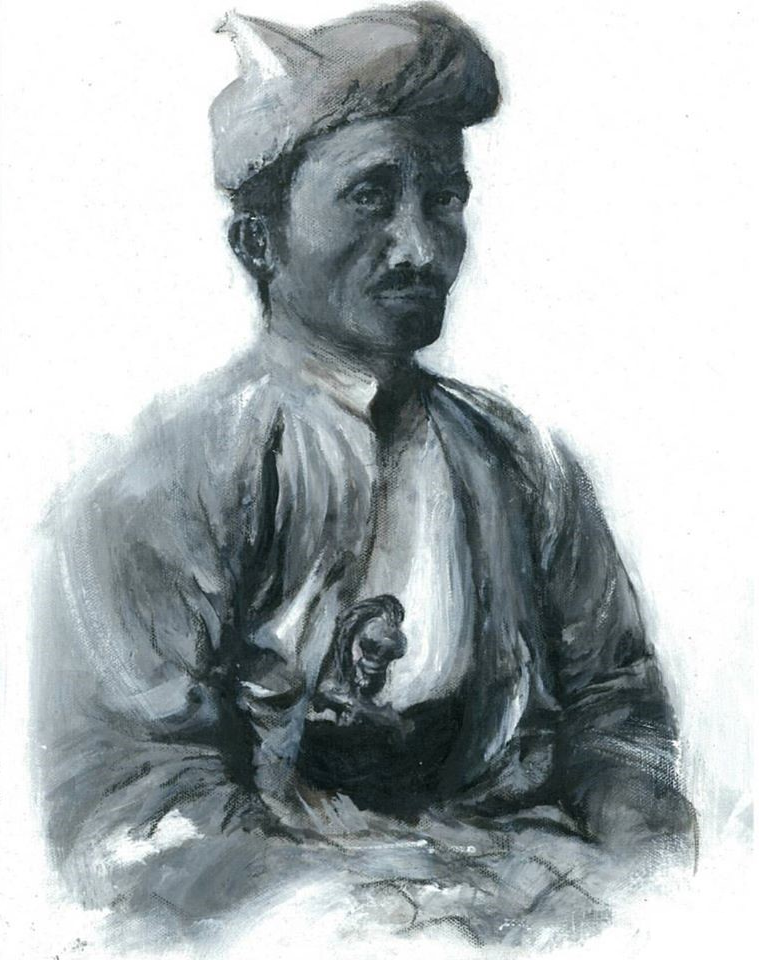
An illustration of Datu Patinggi Ali.

After the death of Sultan Tengah, the Sultan of Brunei retook power, although he let the chiefs, who served Sultan Ibrahim to continue their roles, and which Sarawak would be controlled by a Datu Patinggi.

Antimony ore was discovered in Siniawan and Jambusan in 1823. The Bruneian sultan had appointed Ali as the governor of Sarawak in the 1820s. The Chinese mined antimony ore in Siniawan, while the Malays who resided in the Tonga Tanah used Bidayuh laborers. However, as soon as Sultan Omar Ali Saifuddin II Brunei realized that antimony ore and gold had been discovered in the Bau area, the Sultan named Pengiran Indera Mahkota as the new Governor of Sarawak in 1827, replacing Datu Patinggi Ali, allowing Brunei to take control of the antimony mines and commerce. The administrative center of Sarawak was relocated by Pengiran Indera Mahkota in 1826 from Lidah Tanah to Santubong and subsequently to Kuching. It is said that he moved the administrative center to Kuching using the fear of pirates as justification. However, a deliberate measure was taken to lessen Ali's influence and authority. The full control of mining activities and antimony trade in Bau was made feasible by Pengiran Indera Mahkota when they seized power from Ali to govern Sarawak.

Mullen, a supporter of Ali, said that Bidayuh and Malays were made to work long hours in the antimony mine. Before Pengiran Indera Mahkota arrived, he had been in charge of them for a considerable time. When he saw the misery of his followers—who were compelled to labor at Pengiran Indera Mahkota's antimony mine—he was reportedly angered. The insistence of Pengiran Indera Mahkota that his followers pay extremely high taxes infuriated Ali even more. Additionally, because Pengiran Indera Mahkota controlled all commercial activity, they could not trade as freely as before.

However following ten years of hardship as a slave worker, Datu Patinggi Ali rallied his supporters from Siniawan to oppose Pengiran Indera Mahkota. They began to resist in 1836. Datu Bandar, Datu Amar, and Datu Temenggong helped Ali. Patinggi Ali, one of Datu's disciples, first constructed defense fortifications in Siniawan, Lidah Tanah, and other locations—an additional location upstream Bau. They aimed to remove the Bruneian governor and liberate Sarawak from the Sultanate of Brunei's rule. In addition to setting up battle plans, he offered them encouragement and counsel. They put up a fierce fight with Pengiran Indera Makkota. They were still unable to vanquish Pengiran Indera Mahkota despite several battles. Similarly, Ali was defeated by Pengiran Indera Mahkota as well.

This conflict persisted and worsened in 1838 and into 1839. Ali received assistance, as the Sambas Sultan had pledged. Additionally, there was material indicating that the Dutch had prepared to assist the people of the Bau area in defeating the Pengiran Indera Mahkota. Pengiran Muda Hashim understood how tough it would be to overcome Ali's troops. James Brooke, an English traveler in Kuching at the time, was approached for assistance. Brooke and a few other Royalist crew members sailed up the Sarawak River to Siniawan in 1840. The ship was outfitted with contemporary weaponry. There were several conflicts and occasionally discussions with Ali. At last, Brooke was said to have defeated his army at the Lidah Tanah citadel with 600 part-time troops who were Iban, Malay, and Chinese.

The scarcity of food supplies at the time forced Ali's supporters to flee, and many of them—particularly the Bidayuh people—starved to death. The fact that Datu Patinggi Abdul Gapur and Datu Tumanggong Mersal fled to Sambas and Datu Patinggi Ali sought safety in Sarikei after Brooke put an end to the uprising demonstrated the Sultanate of Sambas' sympathy for the rebels. By late 1840, Datu Patinggi Ali had promised to terminate the conflict, but only if Pengiran Indera Mahkota and his family left Kuching. They were spared along with him and his supporters. The conflict with Pengiran Indera Mahkota ended with the aforesaid arrangement. In the end, he and his supporters were able to drive Pengiran Indera Mahkota and his family from Sarawak. At Belidah in December 1840, he submitted, knowing that Brooke would go on to rule an independent Sarawak, with the idea that Brooke would take over the role of Raja and put an end to his oppression by the Brunei Pengirans.

=== Raj of Sarawak (1841–1946) ===
The White Rajah territorial gains from 1841 to 1905.

In August 1845, Rear-Admiral Thomas Cochrane arrived at Brunei with a squadron of from six to eight ships to release two Lascar seamen who were believed to be hidden there. Badruddin accused Yusof of being involved in the slave trade due to his close relations with a notable pirate leader –Sharif Usman– in Marudu Bay and the Sultanate of Sulu. Denying the allegation, Yusof refused to attend a meeting with Cochrane, and escaped after being threatened with force by Cochrane before regaining his own force in Brunei's capital. Cochrane then sailed away to Marudu Bay in pursuit of Usman, while Yusof was defeated by Badruddin. Hashim managed to establish a rightful position in Brunei Town to become the next sultan after successfully defeating the pirates led by Yusof who fled to Kimanis in northern Borneo, where he was executed. Yusof was the favourite noble to the Sultan and with Hashim's victory, this upset the chances of the son of Sultan Omar Ali Saifuddin II becoming the next leader. Mahkota, after his capture in Sarawak in 1844 became the Sultan's adviser in Yusof's absence. He prevailed on the Sultan to order the execution of Hashim, whose presence had become unwelcome to the royal family, especially due to his close ties with Brooke that were favourable to English policy. Beside that, an adventurer named Haji Saman, who was connected to Yusof, played upon the Sultan's fear of Hashim taking his throne. By the order of the Sultan, Hashim and his brother Badruddin together with their family were assassinated in 1846. One of Badruddin's slaves, Japar, survived the attack and intercepted HMS Hazard, which brought him to Sarawak to inform Brooke. Enraged by the news, Brooke organised an expedition to avenge Hashim's death with the aid of Cochrane from the Royal Navy with Phlegethon. On 6 July 1846, Sultan Omar Ali Saifuddin II complained through a letter about the discourtesy of HMS Hazard and invited Cochrane to ascend the capital of Brunei with two boats.

HEICS Phlegethon, HMS Spiteful and HMS Royalist then moved up to the river on 8 July where they were fired on from every position with slight damage. Mahkota and the Sultan retreated upriver while most of the population fled upon their arrival at Brunei's capital, leaving the brother of the Sultan's son, Pengiran Muhammad, who was badly wounded and Pengiran Mumin, an opponent of the Sultan's son who despised the decision of his royal family to be involved in conflict with the British. The British destroyed the town forts and invited the population to return with no harm to be done to them while the Sultan remained hiding in the jungle. Another expedition was sent to the interior but failed to find the Sultan. Brooke remained in Brunei with Captain Rodney Mundy and HMS Iris along with the Phlegethon and HMS Hazard while the main expedition continued their mission to suppress piracy in northern Borneo.

Upon finding that Haji Saman was living in Membakut and that he was involved in the plotting that caused Hashim's death, HEICS Phlegethon and HMS Iris departed there destroyed Haji Saman's house and captured the town of Membakut although Saman managed to escape. Brooke returned again to Brunei and finally managed to induce the Sultan to return to the capital where the Sultan wrote a letter of apology to Queen Victoria for the killings of Hashim, his brother and their family. Through his confession, the Sultan recognised Brooke's authority over Sarawak and mining rights throughout the territory without requiring him to pay any tribute as well granting the island of Labuan to the British. Brooke departed Brunei and left Mumin in charge together with Mundy to keep the Sultan in line until the British government made a final decision to acquire the island. Following the ratification agreement of the transfer of Labuan to the British, the Sultan also agreed to allow British forces to suppress all piracy along the coast of Borneo.

==== World War II ====
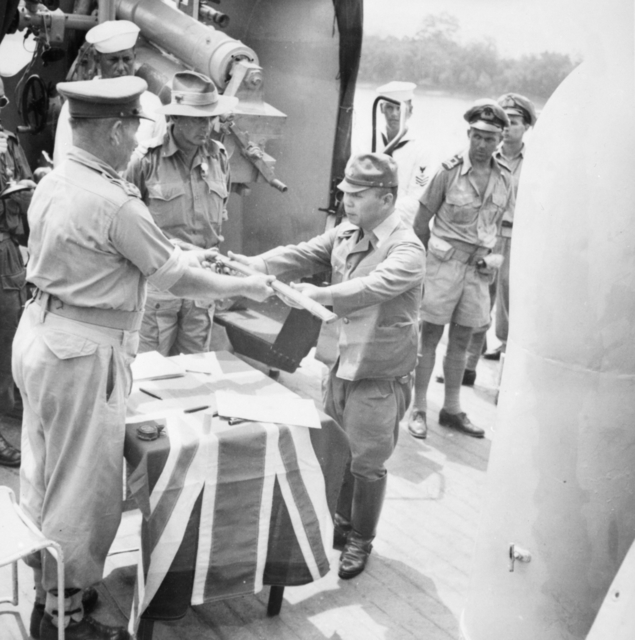
The official surrender ceremony of the Japanese to the Australian Imperial Force (AIF) on board HMAS Kapunda in Kuching on 11 September 1945

Following World War I, the Empire of Japan began to expand their range in Asia and the Pacific. Vyner became aware of the growing threats and began to institute reforms. Under the treaty of protection, Britain was responsible for Sarawak's defence but it could do little, most of its forces having been deployed to the war in Europe against Germany and the Kingdom of Italy. The defence of Sarawak depended on a single Indian infantry battalion –the 2/15 Punjab Regiment– together with the local forces of Sarawak and Brunei. As Sarawak had a significant number of oil refineries in Miri and Lutong, the British feared that these supplies would fall to Japanese control, and thus instructed the infantry to carry out a scorched earth policy. On 16 December 1941, a Japanese navy detachment on Sagiri arrived at Miri from Cam Ranh Bay in French Indochina. The Japanese then launched an air attack on Kuching on 19 December, bombing parts of the town's airfield while machine-gunning people in the streets. The attack created panic and sent residents fleeing to rural areas. The Dutch submarine HNLMS K XVI managed to bring down the Japanese from Miri but, with the arrival of the Shirakumo together with other ships, the Japanese secured the town on 24 December. From 7 January 1942, Japanese troops in Sarawak crossed the border of Dutch Borneo and proceeded to neighbouring North Borneo. The 2/15 Punjab Regiment were forced to withdraw to Dutch Borneo and later surrendered on 9 March after most of the Allies had surrendered in Java. A steamship of Sarawak –the SS Vyner Brooke– was sunk while evacuating nurses and wounded servicemen in the aftermath of the fall of Singapore. Most of its surviving crew were massacred on Bangka Island.

Lacking air protection, Sarawak, together with rest of the island, fell to the Japanese and Vyner took sanctuary in Australia. Many of the British and Australian soldiers captured after the fall of Malaya and Singapore were brought to Borneo and held as prisoners of war in Batu Lintang camp in Sarawak and Sandakan camp in North Borneo. The Japanese military authorities placed the southern part of Borneo under the navy, while its army were responsible for management of the north. As part of the Allied Campaign to retake their possessions in the East, Allied forces were sent to Borneo in the Borneo Campaign and liberated the island. The Australian Imperial Force (AIF) played a significant role in the mission. The Allies' Z Special Unit provided intelligence gathering which facilitated the AIF landings. Most of the major towns of Sarawak were bombed during this period. The war ended on 15 August 1945 following the Japanese surrender and the administration of Sarawak was undertaken by the British Military Administration from September. Vyner returned to administer Sarawak but decided to cede it to the British government as a Crown colony on 1 July 1946 due to a lack of resources to finance reconstruction.

== Organisation ==
=== Sultanate period (1599–1641) ===
Sultan Tengah was accompanied by more than 1,000 soldiers from the Dayak, Kedayan, and the Bunut, who came from Brunei, to Sarawak. A coterie of Bruneian nobility also followed him there. Sultan Tengah constructed a fortified palace in Sungai Bedil, Santubong in 1599. Which would be used by both the succeeding provinces and the Raj of Sarawak in the future.

Sultan Tengah also had forty boats fully armed, when he departed from Sukadana in 1638. After he came back to Sambas, he was later wounded by a Sakai with a broken harpoon as he paused to relieve himself at Kampung Batu Buaya on his way back to Sarawak. He died soon after and was buried at Sematan, Sarawak in 1641.

=== Provincial period (1641–1841) ===
The armies of Sarawak (Bau) before the uprising, were apart of the main Bruneian military, the Sarawak Malays controlling most of the coast, while the Dayaks controlled the interior.

During the Brunei Pengiran era which started from 1827. In modern-day Bau District, they rebelled against the Brunei Pengirans in 1836 which ended until 1840 with Datu Pattingi Ali voluntarily surrender to James Brooke.

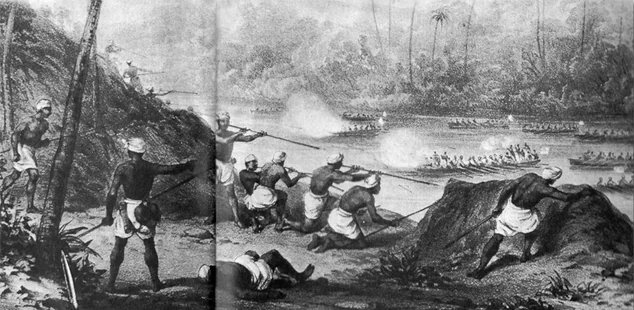
An illustration of Iban forces led by Rentap resisting attacks from James Brooke forces at the Battle of Kerangan Peris

==== Weaponry ====
===== Close-ranged weaponry =====
Most of the Dayak tribes used the mandau, although they did use other weapons like the parang latok or piso pedang, alongside the Sarawak Malays, both also used spears. since the Dayaks traditionally relied on melee, they had a high emphasis on shields such as the kliau.

===== Ranged weaponry =====
Initially, both the interior and the coast mostly used the sumpit though the Malays preferred more Malay traditional weapons like bows and arrows. But with the arrival of gunpowder weapons, primarily muskets in general, the interior and coastal groups responded differently but both accepted the use of them with the Sarawakian Malays quick to obtain them from merchants. While the Dayaks also had them but had uneven distribution, mostly relying on traditional weapons which James Brooke took note of. Both also used cannons as it was widespread, with again the Dayaks having an uneven distribution.

=== White Rajah period (1841–1946) ===
At least 24 forts were built throughout Sarawak during the White Rajah period, which were primarily used as administrative centres and centres for defence.

The government worked to restore peace where piracy and tribal feuds had grown rampant and its success depended ultimately on the co-operation of the native village headmen, while the Native Officers acted as a bridge. The Sarawak Rangers was established in 1862 as a para-military force of the raj. The Sarawak rangers evolved from the fortmen which were raised to defend Kuching in 1846.

The Raj of Sarawak military fought in the Pacification of Lanun and Anglo-Bruneian War prior to World War II.

The Sarawak Rangers were first commanded by William Henry Rodway, from 1862 until 1870 where Major F.A. Walter, a retired officer from 97th foot, succeeded him. Rodway assumed control again on Sarawak Rangers from 1872 to his retirement in 1881, and were highly skilled in jungle warfare and general policing duties, being equipped with various western rifles such as Martini Henry, cannons and native weaponry.

They were based in a number of forts constructed at strategic locations in towns and at river mouths. Aside from protecting Sarawak's borders, they were used to fight any rebels and were engaged in a number of campaigns during their history. In times of emergency or war, they could depend on the support of the local population and tribespeople.

the Sarawak Rangers were disbanded for a few years until 1932, only to be reformed as Sarawak Constabulary and mobilised for the Second World War with 900 members mainly comprising Dayaks and Malays in which they attempted to defend Sarawak from Japanese invasion in 1942 at the start of the Pacific War. After the abdication of Charles Vyner Brooke in 1946 and the creation of the Crown Colony of Sarawak, the Sarawak Rangers became a colonial unit under direct British control and saw action in both the Malayan Emergency and the Borneo Confrontation.

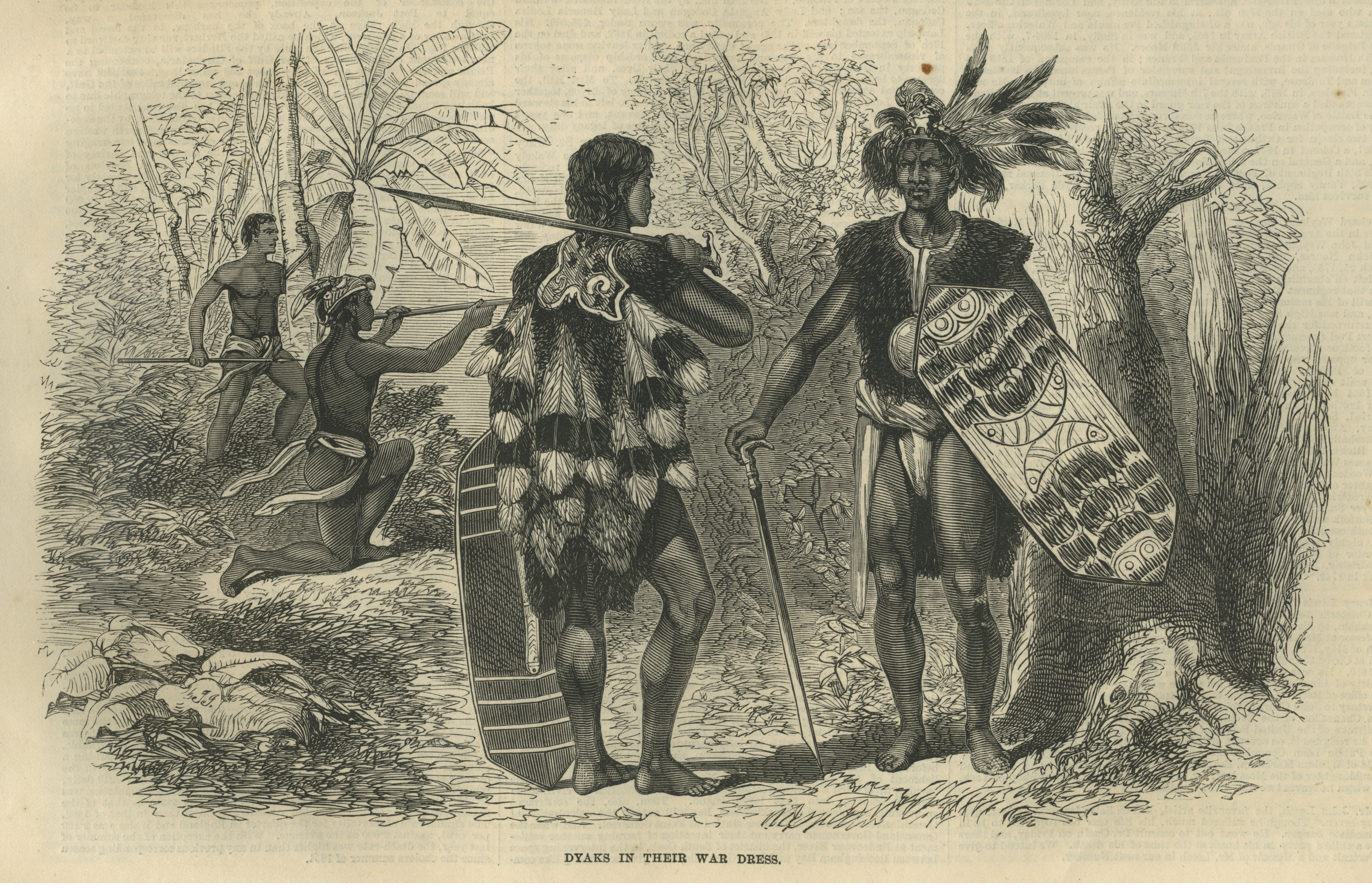
The Dayaks, who subsequently became Brooke followers and most loyal to the raj along with the local Malays of Sarawak

== See also ==
- Edge of the World (2021 flim)

== Sources ==
- anon (1862). Mr. St. John's Borneo in The North British Review. Vol. 36–37. Leonard Scott (American Edition).
- Bayly, Christopher Alan; Harper, Timothy Norman (2005). Forgotten Armies: The Fall of British Asia, 1941–1945. Harvard University Press. ISBN 978-0-674-01748-1.
- Ellinwood, DeWitt C. Jr.; Enloe, Cynthia H. (1978). Ethnicity and the Military in Asia. Transaction Publishers. ISBN 978-1-4128-2290-9.
- Epstein, M. (2016). The Statesman's Year-Book: Statistical and Historical Annual of the States of the World for the Year 1933. Springer. ISBN 978-0-230-27062-6.
- Gott, Richard (2011). Britain's Empire: Resistance, Repression and Revolt. Verso Books. ISBN 978-1-84467-892-1.
- Gregory, Zayn (2015), The Maqam of Sultan Tengah, BinGreogory
- Haji Abdul Karim bin Haji Abdul Rahman (4 April 2016). Sejarah Pengasasan Dan Asal Usul Kerajaan Brunei Berdasarkan Sumber Lisan (PDF) (PhD thesis) (in Malay). Universiti Malaya.
- Hilda, Tunku (2015). "Kino Santubung Megalithic Mystery: Enter The Dragon A page in Mystery". KINO (Kuching In and Out). Archived from the original on 29 September 2019.
- Jackson, Ashley (2006). The British Empire and the Second World War. A&C Black. ISBN 978-0-8264-3760-0.
- Kratoska, Paul H. (2013). Southeast Asian Minorities in the Wartime Japanese Empire. Routledge. ISBN 978-1-136-12506-5.
- Lockard, Craig (2009). Southeast Asia in World History. Oxford University Press. ISBN 978-0-19-972196-2.
- Miller, Harry (1970). Pirates of the Far East. Hale. ISBN 9780709114291.
- Mills, Lennox Algernon (1966). British Malaya, 1824–1867. Oxford University Press.
- Ooi, Keat Gin (1999). Rising Sun over Borneo: The Japanese Occupation of Sarawak, 1941–1945. Palgrave Macmillan UK. ISBN 978-1-349-27300-3.
- Ooi, Keat Gin (2013). Post-war Borneo, 1945–50: Nationalism, Empire and State-Building. Routledge. ISBN 978-1-134-05803-7.
- Pateman, Colin (2017). B-24 Bridge Busters: RAF Liberators Over Burma. Fonthill Media. GGKEY:ZSXA7694KY6.
- Ringgit, Danielle Sendou (2016). "A brush with royalty in Sambas". The Borneo Post. Archived from the original on 7 November 2017.
- Rottman, Gordon L. (2002). World War II Pacific Island Guide: A Geo-military Study. Greenwood Publishing Group. ISBN 978-0-313-31395-0.
- Royal Asiatic Society (1960). Journal of the Malaysian Branch of the Royal Asiatic Society. Vol. 33. Royal Asiatic Society.
- Sarawak State Government (2014). "Sarawak as a British Crown Colony (1946–1963)". Government of Sarawak. Archived from the original on 4 August 2017.
- Sarawak State Secretary Office (2016), Sarawak Before 1841, Official Website of Sarawak State Government
- Saunders, Graham (2013). A History of Brunei. Routledge. ISBN 978-1-136-87394-2.
- Shepley, Nick (2015). Red Sun at War Part II: Allied Defeat in the Far East. Andrews UK Limited. ISBN 978-1-78166-302-8.
- Sidhu, Jatwan S. (2016). Historical Dictionary of Brunei Darussalam. Rowman & Littlefield Publishers. ISBN 978-1-4422-6459-5.
- Talib, Naimah S. (1999). Administrators and Their Service: The Sarawak Administrative Service Under the Brooke Rajahs and British Colonial Rule. Oxford University Press. ISBN 978-983-56-0031-9.
- Tan, Gabriel (2011). "Under the Nippon flag". The Borneo Post. Archived from the original on 4 August 2017.
- Tarling, Nicholas (2001). A Sudden Rampage: The Japanese Occupation of Southeast Asia, 1941–1945. C. Hurst & Co. Publishers. ISBN 978-1-85065-584-8.
- Tarling, Nicholas (2003). Imperialism in Southeast Asia. Routledge. ISBN 1-134-57081-3.
- Tomi (2014), Pasak Negeri Kapuas 1616-1822, Feliz Books, ISBN 978-602-961-357-5
- Williams, Mary H. (1999). Special Studies, Chronology, 1941–1945. Government Printing Office. ISBN 978-0-16-001876-3.
- Yust, Walter (1947). Ten eventful years: a record of events of the years preceding, including and following World War II, 1937 through 1946. Encyclopaedia Britannica.
