= Battle of Lidah Tanah (1836) =

- Part of Initial phase of the Sarawak Uprising of 1836
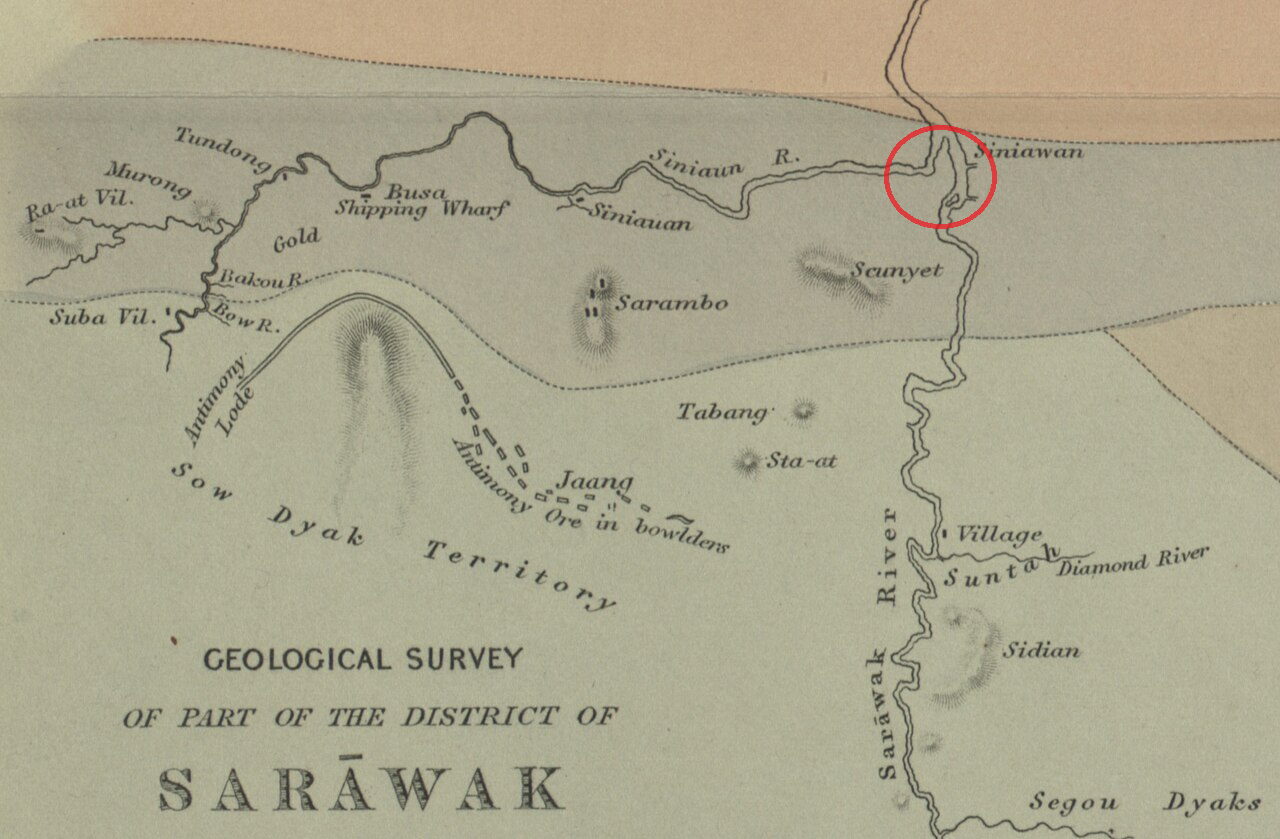
- Location of the battle
Date	2 June 1836 (190 years ago)
Location	Lidah Tanah
Result	Sarawakian Rebel victory

Belligerents
Rebels	Bruneian Empire

Commanders and leaders
Datu Patinggi Ali	Pengiran Indera Mahkota

Strength
Unknown	900-1,200 men

Casualties and losses
Unknown	Heavy

The Battle of Lidah Tanah on 2 June 1836, was the first major military action between the Bruneian and Sarawakian armies during the Sarawak Uprising of 1836.

== Background ==
Antimony ore was discovered in Siniawan and Jambusan in 1823. The Bruneian sultan had appointed Ali as the governor of Sarawak in the 1820s. The Chinese mined antimony ore in Siniawan, while the Malays who resided in the Tonga Tanah used Bidayuh laborers. However, as soon as Sultan Omar Ali Saifuddin II Brunei realised that antimony ore and gold had been discovered in the Bau area, the Sultan named Pengiran Indera Mahkota as the new Governor of Sarawak in 1827, replacing Datu Patinggi Ali, allowing Brunei to take control of the antimony mines and commerce. The administrative centre of Sarawak was relocated by Pengiran Indera Mahkota in 1826 from Lidah Tanah to Santubong and subsequently to Kuching. It is said that he moved the administrative centre to Kuching using the fear of pirates as justification. However, a deliberate measure was taken to lessen Ali's influence and authority. The full control of mining activities and antimony trade in Bau was made feasible by Pengiran Indera Mahkota when they seized power from Ali to govern Sarawak. The uprising began with open hostilities near Lidah Tanah, a fortified rebel position along the Sarawak River. Rebel forces led by Datu Patinggi Ali, Datu Patinggi Abdul Gapur, Datu Temenggong Mersal and other chiefs established fortifications to resist Brunei authority.

== Rebel and Bruneian forces assemble ==
Mahkota immediately targeted for the rebel's main base of operations of Lidah Tanah, the most strategic citadel out of all of them. Meanwhile the Sultan sent his uncle, Pengiran Muda Hashim to quell the rebellion, with Mahkota immediately assembling levies. There was also a reliance on armed retainer or retainers. These levies used muskets and traditional weapons. Meanwhile armed retainers and soldiers were usually armed with muskets, spears and chenangkas.

Mahkota made a fatal mistake in not bringing cannons, assuming the takeover of the fort would be easy or found it difficult to carry them since the cannons of the time were swivel guns made of bronze, brass and other materials.

The rebel side, the rebels were made up of Sarawak Malay militias and Bidayuh warriors armed with basic and traditional weaponry and firearms and cannons supplied by the Sultan of Sambas.

== Rebel fortifications ==
The rebels built wooden stockades using heavy hardwood timber. These fortifications consisted of palisades embedded deep in the ground with sharpened tops to prevent climbing and elevated firing platforms behind the walls, the rebels also blocked parts of the Sarawak River via using felled trees, put stakes made from wood driven into the riverbed and other methods.

== Assault ==
As soon as Ali heard the approach of the Bruneian forces, he immediately commanded the Bidayuh to hide in the jungles near the river to ambush the Bruneian forces, he likely predicted that the Bruneian forces would go the river.

As Ali predicted, the Bruneian forces went to the Sarawak River and met obstacles made by the rebels, they were ambushed by the Bidayuh while stuck in the Sarawak River and exposed to gunfire by the rebels, forcing the Bruneian forces to flee the battlefield.

=== Aftermath ===
The battle ended with a quick Bruneian defeat, with rebels maintaining control over much of the upriver territory. This demonstrated the inability of Brunei's governor to suppress the rebellion quickly. However the rebels could likely not do much even after the defeat as they could not expand likely due to the threat of the Iban who opposed Ali. In spite of this, Ali advanced to Siniawan as it was strategic for the rebels.
