= Military leadership in the Sarawak Uprising of 1836 =

Military leadership in the Sarawak Uprising of 1836 was fully settled in both the political and the military structures of the opposing factions by 1836.

The overall military leadership of the elite of the Bruneian Empire was ultimately vested in the Sultan of Brunei as the supreme ruler, and in the regional governors, such as Pengiran Indera Mahkota whom he appointed. Most of the major Bruneian wartime commanders had previous experience in regional governance, trade protection, and localised warfare. A smaller number of military leaders originated from allied local tribes and regional mercenaries. Some of them derived from territories other than Sarawak.

In the rebel camp, the leadership was divided between the local Sarawak Malay chiefs and Bidayuh chiefs. Prominent Malay rebel commanders, such as Datu Patinggi Ali, had previously served the Bruneian Sultanate and had taken informal oaths of loyalty to the crown before joining the rebellion against it.

== The Sultanate of Brunei ==
=== Civilian military leaders ===
Sultan Omar Ali Saifuddien II was Commander-in-Chief of the Bruneian armed forces throughout the conflict; He had appointed Muhammad Saleh as governor, replacing the previous viceroy, Datu Patinggi Ali. During the rebellion, he sent his uncle, Pengiran Muda Hashim to quell the rebellion; who soon asked James Brooke for assistance.

Title	Name	Tenure	Notes
Commander-in-Chief	Omar Ali Saifuddien II	2 June 1836 – 20 December 1840 (1,662 days during the war)	

=== Major officers ===
When the war began, the Bruneian forces stationed in Sarawak Asal consisted of likely around 1,000 men or fewer. That stated, most of the major wartime commanders had some sort of experience. Over the course of the war, the main commanders during the war; in order of service, were Pengiran Indera Mahkota and Pengiran Muda Hashim.

Commanding Generals, Brunei.

No.	Name	Tenure	Notes
1	Pengiran Indera Mahkota Muhammad Saleh	1827 – 20 December 1840	
2	Pengiran Muda Hashim	around 5-9 June, 1836 – 20 December 1840	

=== Minor leaders ===
To turn the tides of the war, Omar Ali Saifuddien II, requested additional aid from the other Bruneian princes in nearby areas by late 1836, in response of the defeat in Lidah Tanah which included.

- James Brooke (Note: Was not apart of assistance of the war effort in the uprising, joining the war in the side of the Bruneian forces in 1839.)
- Sharif Jafar
- Sharif Shabab
- Orang Kaya Temenggung of Lundu
- Orang Kaya Pemanca of Bintulu
- additional chiefs from Miri and Mukah

== Sarawak Asal (The Rebels) ==
In spite of the rebellion already active in the 1830s; no centralised leadership would exist until 1836, when Datu Patinggi Ali became part of the rebellion.

No.	Name	Tenure	Notes
1	Datu Patinggi Ali	1836 – 20 December 1840	
2	Datu Patinggi Abdul Gapur	1836 – 20 December 1840	Later succeeded Ali and recalled and dismissed by James Brooke later on.
3	Datu Tumanggong Mersal	? – 1840	Fled to Sambas alongside Abdul Gapur.
