= Bruneian Civil War =

Bruneian Civil War may refer to:

- Bruneian Civil War of 1660
- Bruneian Civil War of 1826
