= Sarawak Uprising of 1836 =

Rebellion against Brunei

Sarawak Uprising
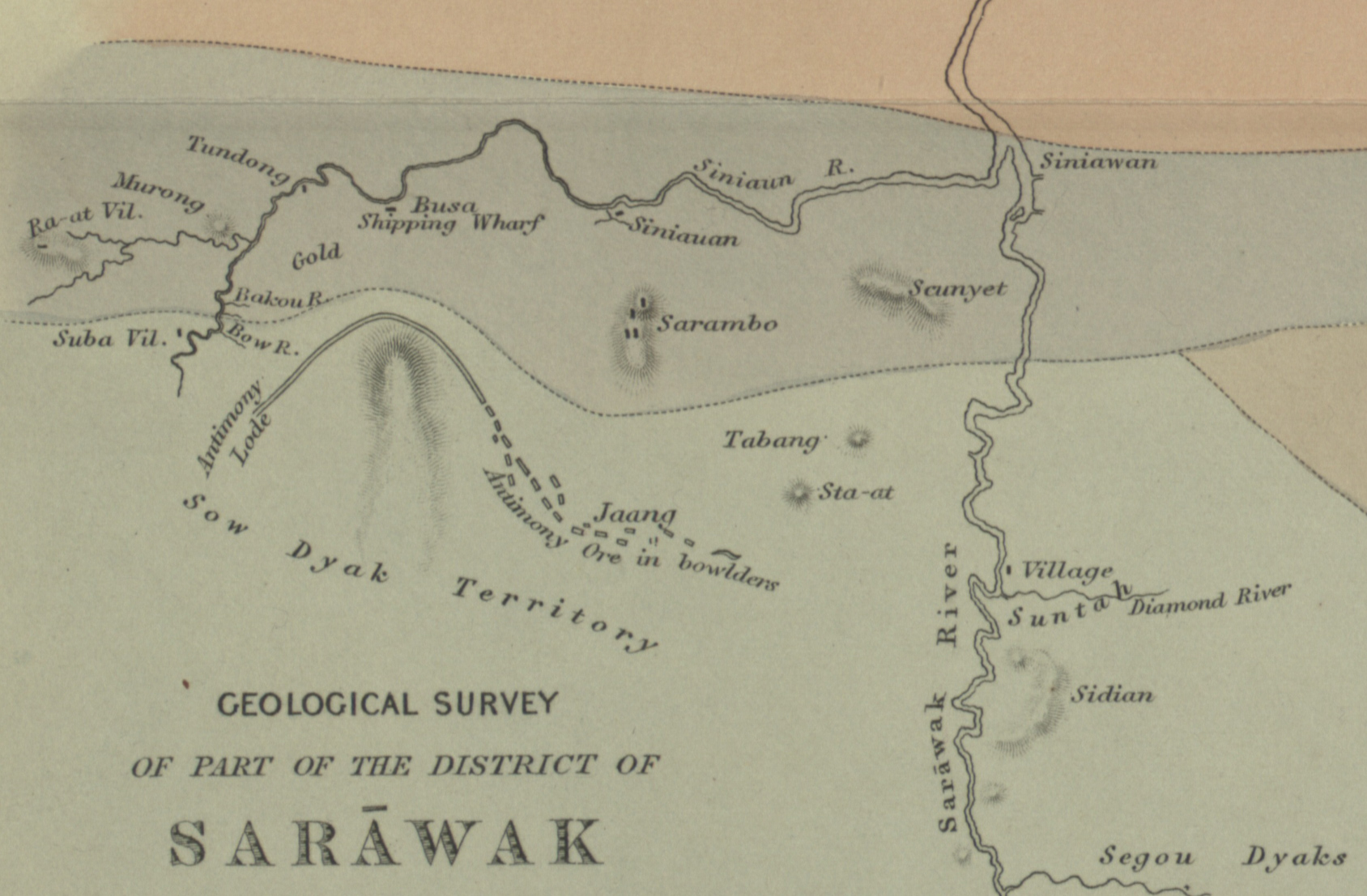
- Upper Sarawak Geological Survey by Hiram Williams in 1846, focused on Siniawan
Date	2 June 1836 – 20 December 1840 (4 years, 6 months, and 18 days)
Location	modern day Bau District, Sarawak
Result	Bruneian victory
Territorial changes	Sarawak is given to James Brooke becoming the "White Rajah" in 1842

Belligerents
Rebels; Sultanate of Sambas; Dutch East Indies	Bruneian Empire

Commanders and leaders
Datu Patinggi Ali (surrendered); Datu Patinggi Abdul Gapur; Datu Tumanggong Mersal and others...	Omar Ali Saifuddien II; Pengiran Indera Mahkota; Pengiran Muda Hashim; James Brooke and others...

Strength
~7,000+ troops	~10,000 troops; 70 troops sent by Sharif Jafar; 600 troops under James Brooke

Casualties and losses
- Heavy

The Sarawak Uprising of 1836 or informally known as the Siniawan War was an armed conflict against Brunei led by a former governor of Sarawak, Datu Patinggi Ali.

This war would lead to the demise of the Bruneian Empire and would open the doors of a new Sarawak after the war's end under the White Rajah, James Brooke who would modernise Sarawak to the European standard.

== Prelude to war ==
Antimony ore was discovered in Siniawan and Jambusan in 1823. The Bruneian sultan had appointed Ali as the governor of Sarawak in the 1820s. The Chinese mined antimony ore in Siniawan, while the Malays who resided in the Tonga Tanah used Bidayuh laborers. However, as soon as Sultan Omar Ali Saifuddin II Brunei realized that antimony ore and gold had been discovered in the Bau area, the Sultan named Pengiran Indera Mahkota as the new Governor of Sarawak in 1827, replacing Datu Patinggi Ali, allowing Brunei to take control of the antimony mines and commerce. The administrative center of Sarawak was relocated by Pengiran Indera Mahkota in 1826 from Lidah Tanah to Santubong and subsequently to Kuching. It is said that he moved the administrative center to Kuching using the fear of pirates as justification. However, a deliberate measure was taken to lessen Ali's influence and authority. The full control of mining activities and antimony trade in Bau was made feasible by Pengiran Indera Mahkota when they seized power from Ali to govern Sarawak.

Mullen, a supporter of Ali, said that Bidayuh and Malays were made to work long hours in the antimony mine. Before Pengiran Indera Mahkota arrived, he had been in charge of them for a considerable time. When he saw the misery of his followers—who were compelled to labor at Pengiran Indera Mahkota's antimony mine—he was reportedly angered. The insistence of Pengiran Indera Mahkota that his followers pay extremely high taxes infuriated Ali even more. Additionally, because Pengiran Indera Mahkota controlled all commercial activity, they could not trade as freely as before.

== Forces ==
=== Brunei ===
Upon hearing of Ali's rebellion the Sultan of Brunei sent his uncle Pengiran Muda Hashim to assist Mahkota in destroying the rebels. Overall Bruneian military command in the duration of the war, under the Sarawak de facto diarchy Mahkota and Muda Hashim. Between late 1836–1840, they had additional men ordered by the Sultan of Brunei to finally quell the rebellion. They also later had the support of James Brooke in the Kota Belidah and Lidah Tanah. During the conflict, the Iban, Kayan, Kenyah, Bruneian Malays and Kedayans sided with the Mahkota. It is estimated that Brunei deployed more than 1,040 men during the course of the war, excluding James Brooke, of which were made up Malay levies, retinue, retainers, warriors and guards.

=== Rebels ===
In spite of the date of 1836, by the 1830s, the region was already in revolt, however Ali's resistance is officially considered the start of the full rebellion, in 1836 Ali's forces quickly gathered at Siniawan making fortifications in Lidah Tanah. Around 1836 or 1837, an exiled prince of the name Pengiran Yusof promised support from the Sultan of Sambas which made many more join the rebellion, desperate to free themselves from Bruneian oppression. In the course of the conflict, the Bidayuh, Chinese and Sarawak Malays sided with the rebels. Later in the conflict, they were armed with firearms, ammunition and cannons from the Sultanate of Sambas.

== War ==
Following 10 years of hardship as a slave worker, Ali rallied his supporters from Siniawan to oppose Pengiran Indera Mahkota. They began to resist in 1836. Datu Bandar, Datu Amar, and Datu Temenggong helped Ali. Patinggi Ali, one of Datu's disciples, first constructed defensive fortifications in Siniawan, Lidah Tanah, and other locations—an additional location upstream Bau. They aimed to remove the Bruneian governor and liberate Sarawak from the Sultanate of Brunei's rule. In addition to setting up battle plans, he offered them encouragement and counsel. They put up a fierce fight against Pengiran Indera Makkota. They were still unable to vanquish Pengiran Indera Mahkota despite several battles. Similarly, Ali was defeated by Pengiran Indera Mahkota as well.

This conflict persisted and worsened in 1838 and into 1839. Ali seek assistance from the Dutch through the Sultanate of Sambas. Pengiran Muda Hashim understood how tough it would be to overcome Ali's troops. James Brooke, an English traveler in Kuching at the time, was approached for assistance. Brooke and a few other Royalist crew members sailed up the Sarawak River to Siniawan in 1840. The ship was outfitted with contemporary weaponry. There were several battles and occasionally discussions with Ali. At last, Brooke was said to have defeated his army at the Lidah Tanah citadel with 600 part-time troops who were Iban, Malay, and Chinese.

The scarcity of food supplies at the time forced Ali's supporters to flee, and many of them—particularly the Bidayuh people—starved to death. The fact that Datu Patinggi Abdul Gapur and Datu Tumanggong Mersal fled to Sambas and Datu Patinggi Ali sought safety in Sarikei after Brooke put an end to the uprising demonstrated the Sultanate of Sambas' sympathy for the rebels. By late 1840, Datu Patinggi Ali had promised to terminate the conflict, but only if Pengiran Indera Mahkota and his family left Kuching. They were spared along with him and his supporters. The conflict with Pengiran Indera Mahkota ended with the aforesaid arrangement. Ultimately, he and his supporters were able to drive Pengiran Indera Mahkota and his family from Sarawak. At Belidah in December 1840, he submitted, knowing that Brooke would go on to rule an independent Sarawak, with the idea that Brooke would take over the role of Rajah and put an end to his oppression by the Brunei Pengirans.

== Aftermath ==
James was able to put an end to the Datu Patinggi Ali-led uprising with the help of his powerful cannons and skillful military strategies. As a return for his accomplishments, Pengiran Muda Hashim signed a contract on 24 September 1841, giving Brooke the position of Rajah of Sarawak and land from the westernmost point of Sarawak, Tanjung Datu, to the Samarahan river. On 18 September 1842, Sultan Omar Ali Saifuddin II made this appointment official. In exchange, Brooke agreed to keep Sarawak's traditions and religion intact, to give the Sultan an annual tribute of $2,500, and to refrain from separating Sarawak from Brunei without the Sultan's permission. The Sultan erred politically in appointing Brooke, but the Englishman had the support of the Royal Navy.
