= Pacification of Lanun =

Anti-piracy operations by the Bruneian Empire

- Part of Piracy in the Sulu and Celebes Seas
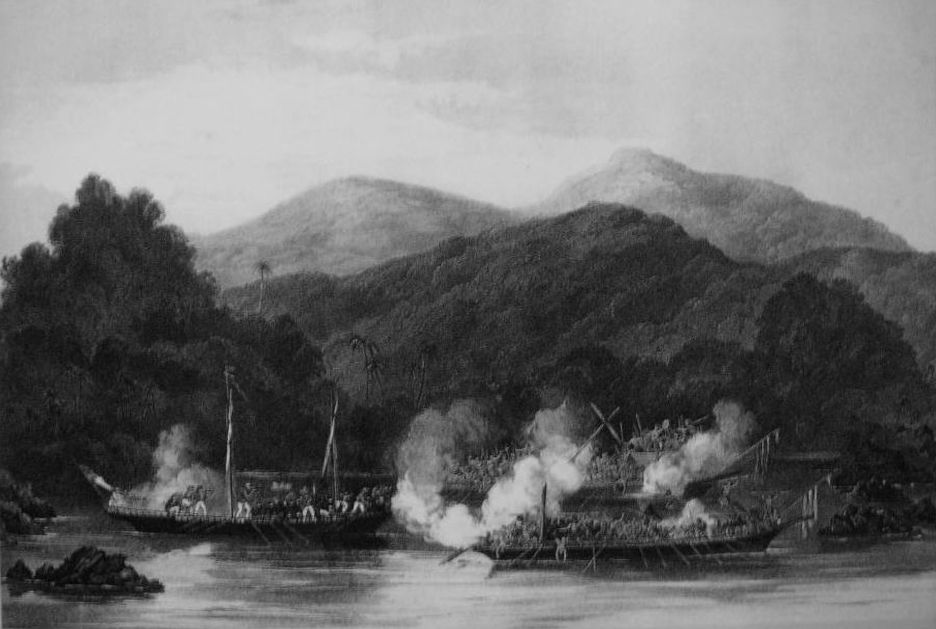
- Naval Action in May 1843
Date	1831 - 1862
Location	Borneo
Result	Bruneian victory: Pirates pacified

Belligerents
Bruneian Empire; United Kingdom; Raj of Sarawak	Sultanate of Sulu; Moro Pirates

Commanders and leaders
Omar Ali Saifuddien II	Sultans of Sulu (until the reign of Mohammad Pulalun Kiram); Various (non-centralized leadership)

Units involved
Bruneian Army; Bruneian Navy; Sarawakian Army; Royal Navy and others...	Moro Pirates

The Pacification of Lanun (Malay: ڤاسيفيكاسي ڤارا ڤنچوري, romanized: Pasifikasi Para Pencuri;) were anti-piracy operations against Pirates by Bruneian Empire and her allies. The Pacification was initiated in 1831 and ended by 1862 with the White Rajah of Sarawak defeating the Pirates at Mukah.

== Anti-piracy operations ==
Major anti-piracy operations didn't begin until 1831 with the defeat of a major slave raiding party in 1829. And with the accession of James Brooke the title of Rajah, gave the Sultan of Brunei confidence that defeating the marauding pirates was possible. With undocumented naval actions ensued.

On May 1862, two ships began their journey down the coast again, shortly finding three of the prahus. The water was shallow and the Rainbow had the Jolly Bachelor in tow; her captain, the Rajah Muda, intended to release the smaller ship as soon as they were in a good firing position. Brooke confirmed with his Sarawakian crew the prahus were pirate. As soon as the Sulus realised they were under attack they began killing the captives while fleeing to dangerous waters. Father McDougall later described the engagement: "So we took to our stations, loaded our guns, and prepared for action. The leading boat had already gained on the other two and was going nearly as fast as the steamer herself. I never saw fellows pull so. We put on all steam, cast off the Jolly, and tried to get in between her and the point, but she beat us, and passed inside of us into shallow water, where we could not follow. Then she opened her fire upon us, which we returned with interest. She, like the others, had no heavy guns, but they all carried three long brass swivels, called lelahs, and plenty of rifles and muskets." The bishop went on to say that one of the captured pirates revealed to him that each of their swivels took seven men to lift and there were forty rifles and muskets aboard each boat, or more.

Captain Brooke's plan, after casting off the Jolly Bachelor, would be to ram the prahus while keeping them engaged so as to prevent the pirates from boarding and overwhelming the Sarawakians. McDougall wrote; "Our plan of action was to silence the brass guns with our rifles, to shake them at their oars with grape and round shot, until we could run into them without their being strong enough to board us. The steamer was kept dodging about within range until the time came to run in; then we got into a good position to put on all steam and given them the stem, which was always admirably and coolly done by Captain Hewat whenever the order was given by the Rajah Mudah." After the first prahu got away the attention was turned to the second boat which was sailing for the shore and when the Rainbow was 200 yards away the Sulus opened fire with all of their guns. For the next few minutes Brooke chased the prahu at full speed before running right over it and sinking her. The Sarawakians called out to the survivors to hang onto the wreckage and wait for rescue, they then went after the third prahu but the Rainbow ran aground in less than two fathoms of water.

The guns were still operable so Brooke had his men return the pirates' fire. No hits were made but near hits forced the pirates to leave their wounded and abandon ship without fighting. Brooke then decided on rescuing the survivors though most of the Sulus took their weapons into the water and continued to fight. The captain also had his men refloat the steamer which was done somewhat easily. Few pirates were recovered according to McDougall and when they saved all that could be, the Rainbow and the Jolly Bachelor continued on slowly down the coast. During this time one of the pirates said that there were three more prahus nearby which were waiting for the three already engaged to rejoin them. After an hour the weather was very calm and a lookout at the masthead spotted the three enemy ships to the starboard, lining up to bear their bow guns on the approaching steamers. However, when the wind picked up again the pirates changed their tactics and hoisted sail to move their ships into broadside position. As the Sarawakians neared the pirates they opened up with their swivels but Brooke waited until his ships were 250 yards away before he gave his men the order to return the fire.

McDougall reported that the final three prahus did not attempt to escape like the first three had and they fought with determination even after all of the Sarawakian guns were brought to bear on them. One of the prahus was run over just as the second and split in two while the largest and final vessel was destroyed by gunfire and sank with a valuable cargo of gold and jewels. McDougall later said: "The poor captives, who were all made fast below as we came up to engage them, were doubtless glad when our stem opened the sides of their ships, and thus let them out of prison. Few, comparatively, were drowned, being mostly all good swimmers. All those who were not lashed to the vessels, or killed by the Illanuns, escaped. Our decks were soon covered with those we picked up, men of every race and nation in the Archipelago, who had been captured by the pirates in their cruise, which had already lasted seven months." McDougall also confirmed the loss of at least one dead and two wounded while several of the pirates were killed or wounded, most having been hit by cannon and rifle fire. In all at least 100 Sulus became casualties while many others escaped to the shore and retreated into the jungle.

== Aftermath ==
By the time Brunei crushed most of piracy activities, Brunei's trade routes were taken by the Sulu Sultanate and started to decline 20 years later in the 1870s and 1880s due to British interest in Brunei, eventually signing the Treaty of Protection. Lasting until her official independence in 1984.

== Sources ==
- Abdul Majid, Harun (2007). Rebellion in Brunei: The 1962 Revolt, Imperialism, Confrontation and Oil. I.B. Tauris. ISBN 978-1-84511-423-7.
- CIA Factbook (2017). "The World Factbook – Brunei". Central Intelligence Agency. Archived from the original on 21 July 2015.
- Sellick, Douglas R. G. (2010). Pirate Outrages: True Stories of Terror on the China Seas. Fremantle Press. ISBN 9781925161786.
- Sidhu, Jatswan S. (2009). Historical Dictionary of Brunei Darussalam. Scarecrow Press. ISBN 978-0-8108-7078-9.
