= House of Digadong =

- Noble family
- Letterhead of Sultan Muhammad Kanzul Alam
- Parent family: House of Bolkiah
- Country: Bruneian Empire; Raj of Sarawak
- Place of origin: Brunei
- Founded: 1807; 219 years ago
- Founder: Muhammad Kanzul Alam
- Titles: Sultan of Brunei; Regent of Brunei (until 1807); co-Governor of Sarawak
- Traditions: Sunni Islam
- Dissolution: (de jure) 1846 (de facto) still exists

The House of Digadong was a noble family who became the de facto ruling family of the Bruneian Sultanate between 1807–1828 and was the co-ruling princely family of Sarawak alongside James Brooke. It was composed of the descendants of Muhammad Kanzul Alam. The dynasty was formally deposed in 1846.

They were an agnatic line which rose after the death of Sultan Muhammad Tajuddin and Muhammad Kanzul Alam temporarily deposing the House of Bolkiah. (Note: Muhammad Alam faced strong opposition from his half-sister, Raja Noor Alam, who fiercely protected her son, Omar Ali Saifuddin II's, succession rights and resisted both her father's and brother's attempts to claim absolute control.) Later Muhammad Alam who would succeed Muhammad Kanzul Alam fought with Omar Ali Saifuddien II in the Bruneian Civil War of 1828. With them being deposed by the House of Bolkiah with the assassination of Muhammad Alam.

They would rose again in Sarawak supported by James Brooke and the British but were formally deposed after the assassination of Pengiran Muda Hashim and his family during the Anglo-Bruneian War.

== Members ==
- Sultan Muhammad Kanzul Alam and his wives
  - Muhammad Alam
  - Raja Noor Alam
  - Pengiran Muda Hassan
  - Pengiran Muda Mohamed
  - Pengiran Muda Hashim
  - Pengiran Sri Banun

== See also ==
- House of Bolkiah
