= Bruneian Civil War of 1826 =

Bruneian Civil War
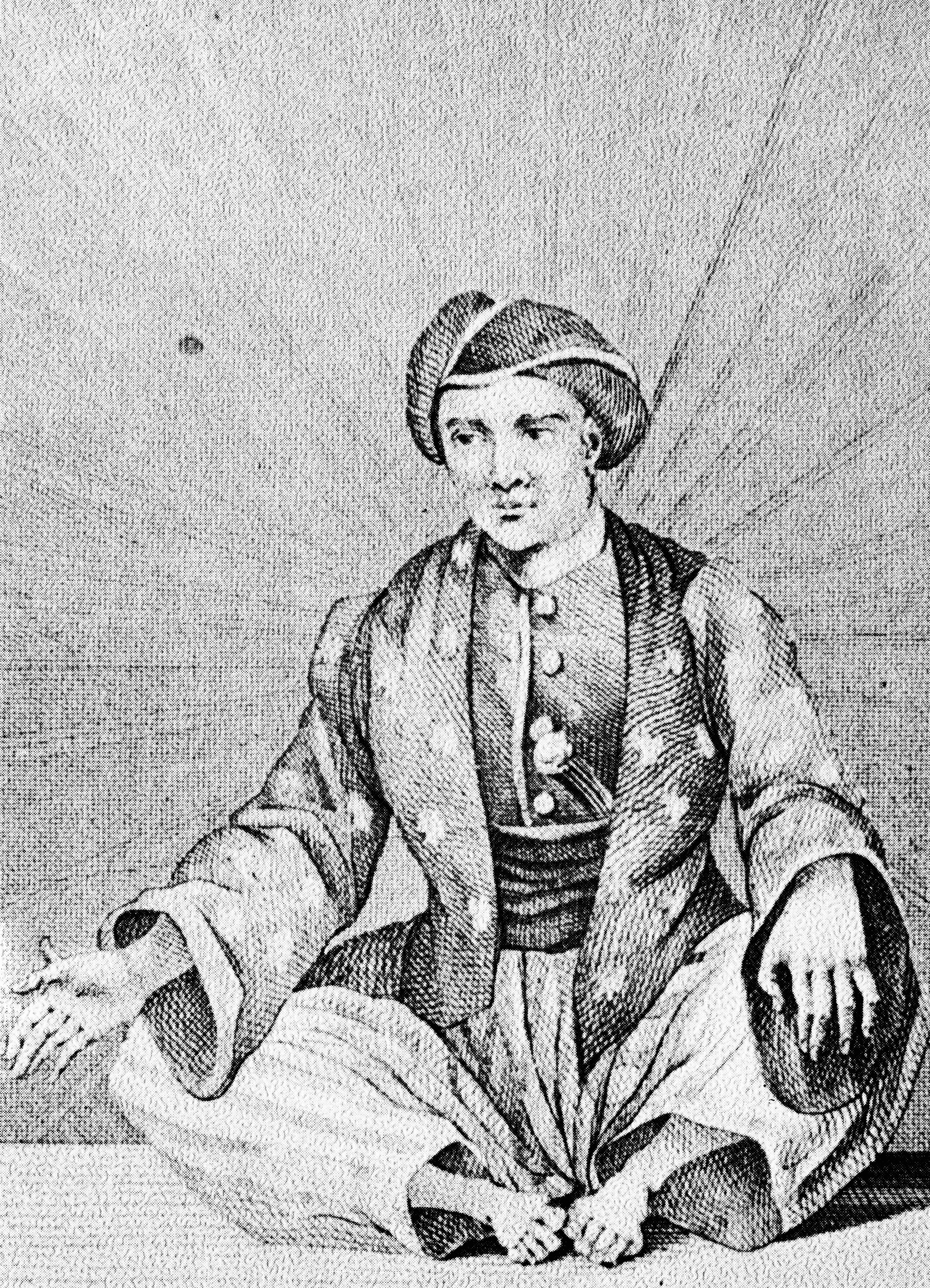
- An illustration of Omar Ali Saifuddien II in before 1852 and after 1846
Date	15 February 1826 –1828 (2 years)
Location	Brunei
Result	House of Bolkiah victory

Belligerents
House of Digadong	House of Bolkiah; Islamic ulama; Muhammad Tajuddin's followers

Commanders and leaders
Muhammad Alam †	Omar Ali Saifuddien II; Raja Isteri Noralam; Minister Abdul Hak

Strength
- each side had around ~400–1,300 warriors

Casualties and losses
- Unknown

The Bruneian Civil War (Malay: Perang Saudara Brunei; Jawi: ڤراڠ ساودارا بروني) or the Bruneian war of succession (Malay: Perang penggantian Brunei; Jawi: ڤراڠ ڤڠݢنتيان بروني) was a civil war in the Bruneian Sultanate from 1826 to 1828 between Muhammad Alam and Omar Ali Saifuddien II. This dispute began when Muhammad Alam chose to assume the throne instead of Pengiran Muda Omar Ali Saifuddin, who was the legitimate successor.

== Prelude ==
In 1804, when Sultan Muhammad Tajuddin abdicated in favour of his son, Sultan Muhammad Jamalul Alam. Sultan Muhammad Tajuddin died soon after, leaving Pengiran Muda Omar Ali Saifuddien, his baby son, as the presumed heir. After resuming the throne for his grandchildren, Sultan Muhammad Tajuddin sought Pengiran Digadong Ayah's regency in 1806, pledging to pick advisers for Pengiran Muda Omar Ali until he reached adulthood. This was owing to Tajuddin's deteriorating health. Pengiran Digadong Ayah, however, broke the terms of the treaty when he proclaimed himself Sultan in 1807 upon the death of Sultan Muhammad Tajuddin. He ruled with his son, Muhammad Alam, until his own passing in 1826. When Sultan Muhammad Kanzul Alam died, he chose Muhammad Alam as his successor, even though he did not wear the royal regalia that denotes absolute authority. This created a public dispute between Muhammad Alam and Omar Ali Saifuddien II's followers.

== War ==
A civil war that broke out in Brunei in the years after his father's death, around 1826–1828. Pengiran Muda Omar Ali Saifuddien and his allies moved to Keingaran Island on 15 February 1826, potentially declaring himself the true Sultan and constructed a defensive posture, about this time, out of concern for their safety. Fears about Muhammad Alam's tyranny during the war, including reports that he required blood ritual and black magic to remain unstoppable, may have led to the flight. This might be seen as Muhammad Alam used brutality and hostage-taking to intimidate followers of Sultan Omar Ali Saifuddin II, so solidifying his image as the ruthless Raja Api.

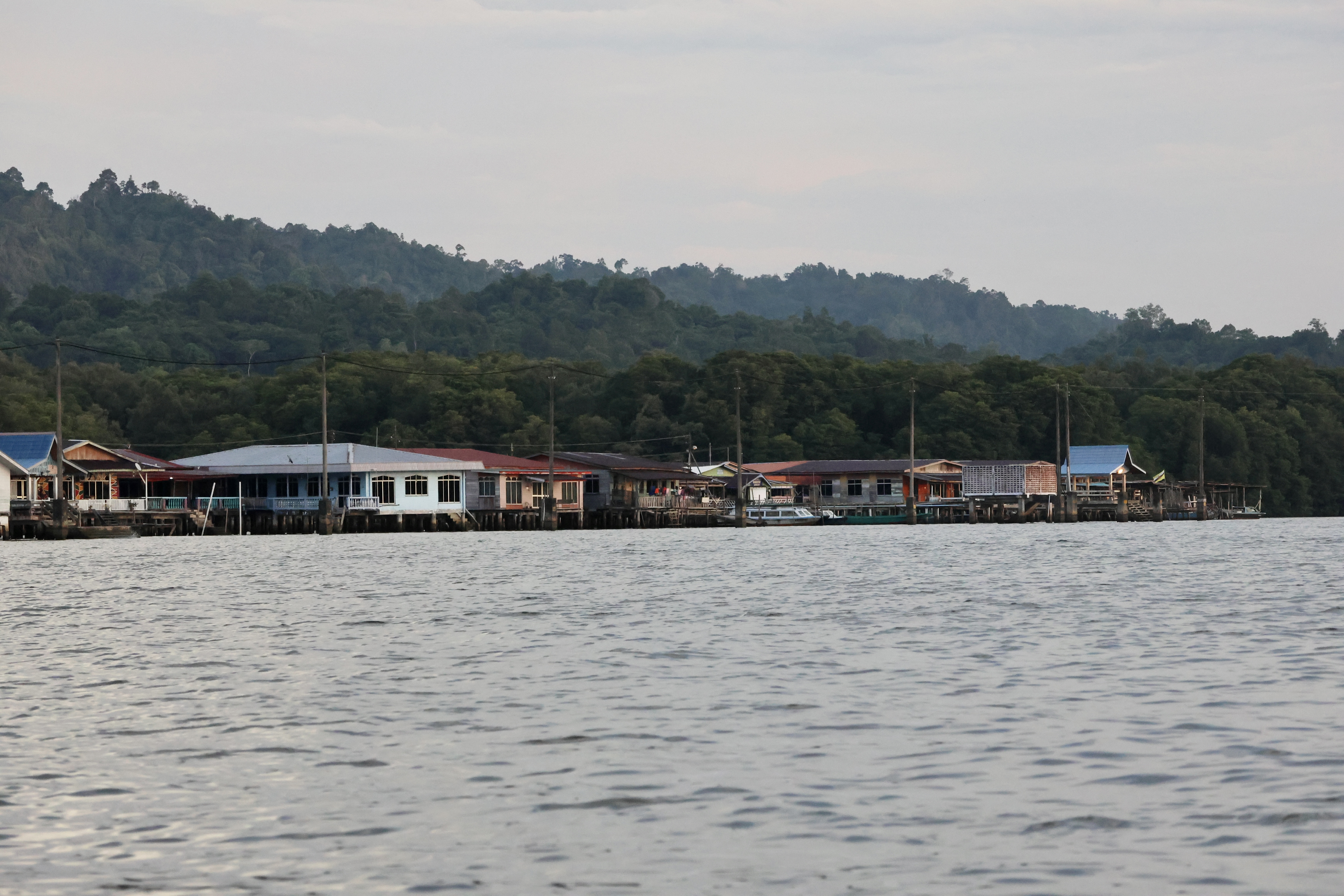
Kampong Burong Pingai Ayer

The people of Brunei, especially those in Kampong Burong Pingai and the nearby districts, were mostly in favour of Omar Ali Saifuddin II. The uprising against Muhammad Alam, headed by Minister Abdul Hak, was motivated by their conviction that Omar Ali Saifuddien had a legitimate claim to the throne. Kampong Burong Pingai was renowned for its highly educated population, which included religious academics who adhered to Islamic doctrines and values of justice. This helped explain why these individuals supported Omar Ali Saifuddien. In the past, they supported Pengiran Muda Muhammad Yusof and Muhammad Alam by their active trading, which benefited Brunei's economy. But the villagers turned against him once he took over, banding up with Omar Ali Saifuddien's followers on Keingaran Island to erect blockades against his rule. Muhammad Alam's supporters, on the other hand, was restricted to his close associates and the House of Digadong, highlighting the fact that his harsh and despotic rule cost him the favour of the general public.

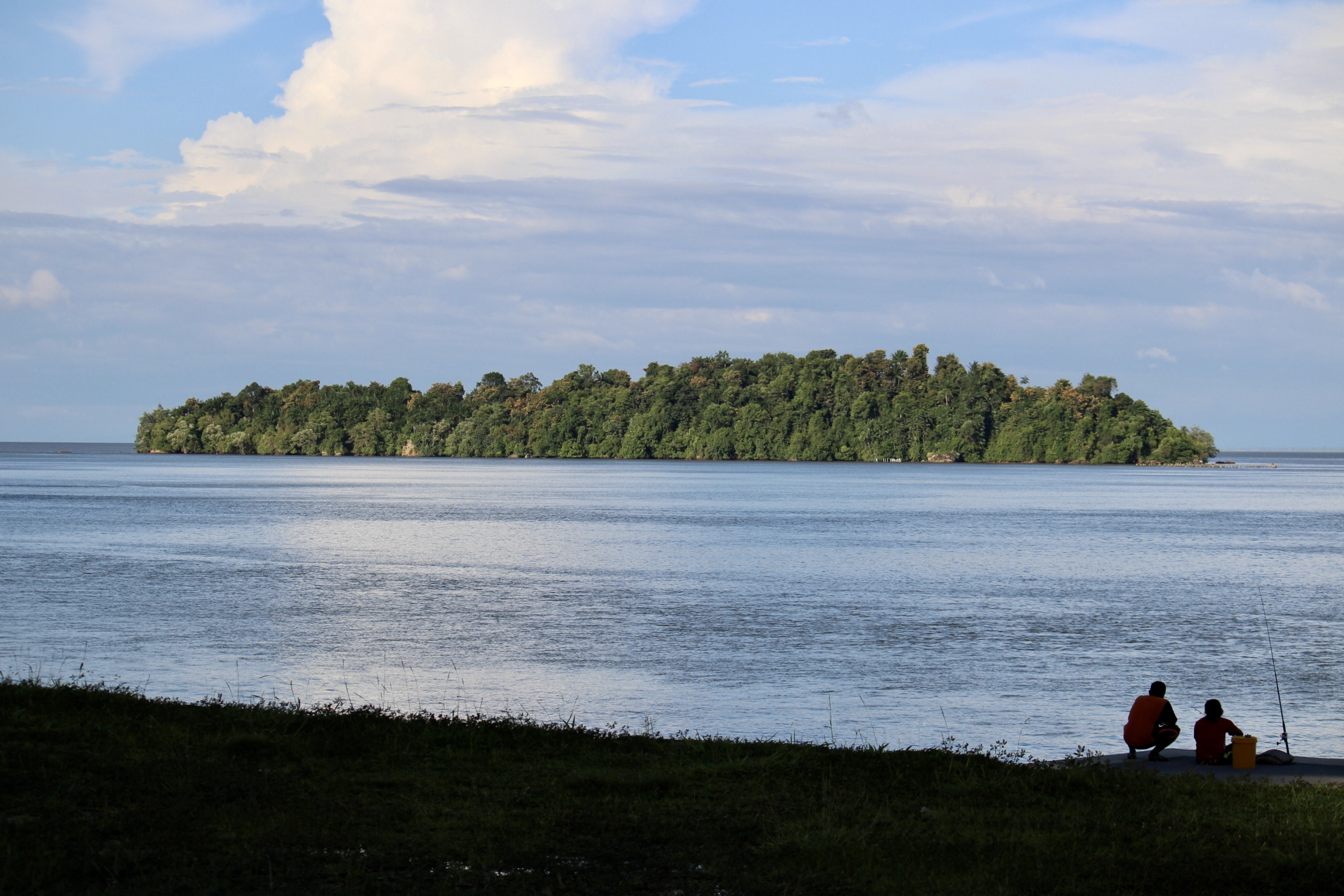
Chermin Island in May 2022

Though there are differing reports of how the death of Muhammad Alam happened, Muhammad Alam's death in 1828 marked the end of Brunei's civil war. According to the commonly accepted story, Muhammad Alam was on Chermin Island when assassins were sent to assassinate him. Raja Isteri Nooralam was the mother of Sultan Omar Ali Saifuddien II and the half-sister of Muhammad Alam. Recognising the seriousness of their mission, these assassins went up to him. To their surprise, he collaborated, giving them advice on how to overcome his seeming invincibility before they buried and garrotted him on the island. However, because of his well-known anger and the absence of eyewitness testimony, historian Pehin Jamil challenges this story.

An alternative interpretation of the end of Muhammad Alam's reign is provided by the second narrative. In this version, he willingly departed Brunei after admitting defeat, rather than being assassinated by assassins. It is said that he moved to Putatan in Sabah to have a simpler life. The Brunei History Centre's 2009 investigation, which located a gravestone in Putatan believed to be that of Muhammad Alam, gives credibility to this narrative. While no concrete proof of his burial on Chermin Island or in the Royal Mausoleum has been discovered, the center pointed out that the gravestone is comparable to royal tombstones discovered in Brunei.

== Aftermath ==
With the death of Muhammad Alam, Omar Ali Saifuddien II ascended the throne, becoming the Sultan of Brunei ruling until 1852. His reign however would be plagued with the creation of Raj of Sarawak, growing British interest and revival of the House of Digadong in Sarawak would eventually result in the Anglo-Bruneian War, being the last war Brunei fought officially and resulted in Brunei forced to give Labuan to Britain.

== Sources ==
- Mail, Asbol; Anwar, Zaidul (2016). "Sultan Muhammad Alam @ Raja Api (1826–1828): Roles and Civil War An Early Analysis". Jurnal Darussalam. 16. Bandar Seri Begawan: Brunei History Centre, Ministry of Culture, Youth and Sports.
- Orr, Tamra (2008). Brunei. Marshall Cavendish. ISBN 978-0-7614-3121-3.
- Saunders, Graham E. (1994). A History of Brunei. Oxford University Press. ISBN 978-967-65-3049-3.
