= Kliau =

Traditional shield of Dayak of Borneo

Klebit
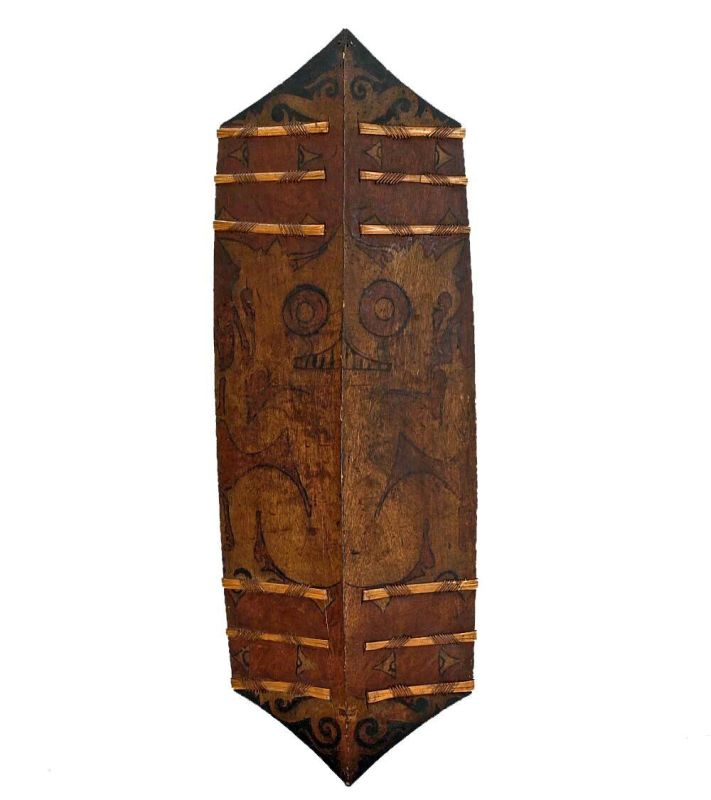
- A Kliau shield with aso (dog) motif
- Type: Shield
- Place of origin: Borneo (East Kalimantan, North Kalimantan, Indonesia & Sarawak, Malaysia)

Service history
- Used by: Dayak people (Kenyah, Kayan, etc)

Specifications
- Length: 110–130 cm (43–51 in)

The Kliau, Keliau, Klau or Kelembit is a traditional shield of the Kenyah and Kayan Dayak of Borneo. This is an almost identical shield to the Kelembit Bok with the exception of the missing bok (hair). It is also similar to other Dayak-type shields, such as the Iban's trabai or terabai, Ngaju's talawang, and klawang or kelawang.

== Description ==
The Kliau is a shield in a shape of a hexagon and made from wood or from bamboo.

== See also ==
- Kurabit
- Baluse
- Klebit Bok
