= Pengiran Indera Mahkota =

Bruneian nobility (1790s–1858)

Pengiran Mohammad Salleh ڤڠيرن محمد صالح
- Pengiran Shahbandar
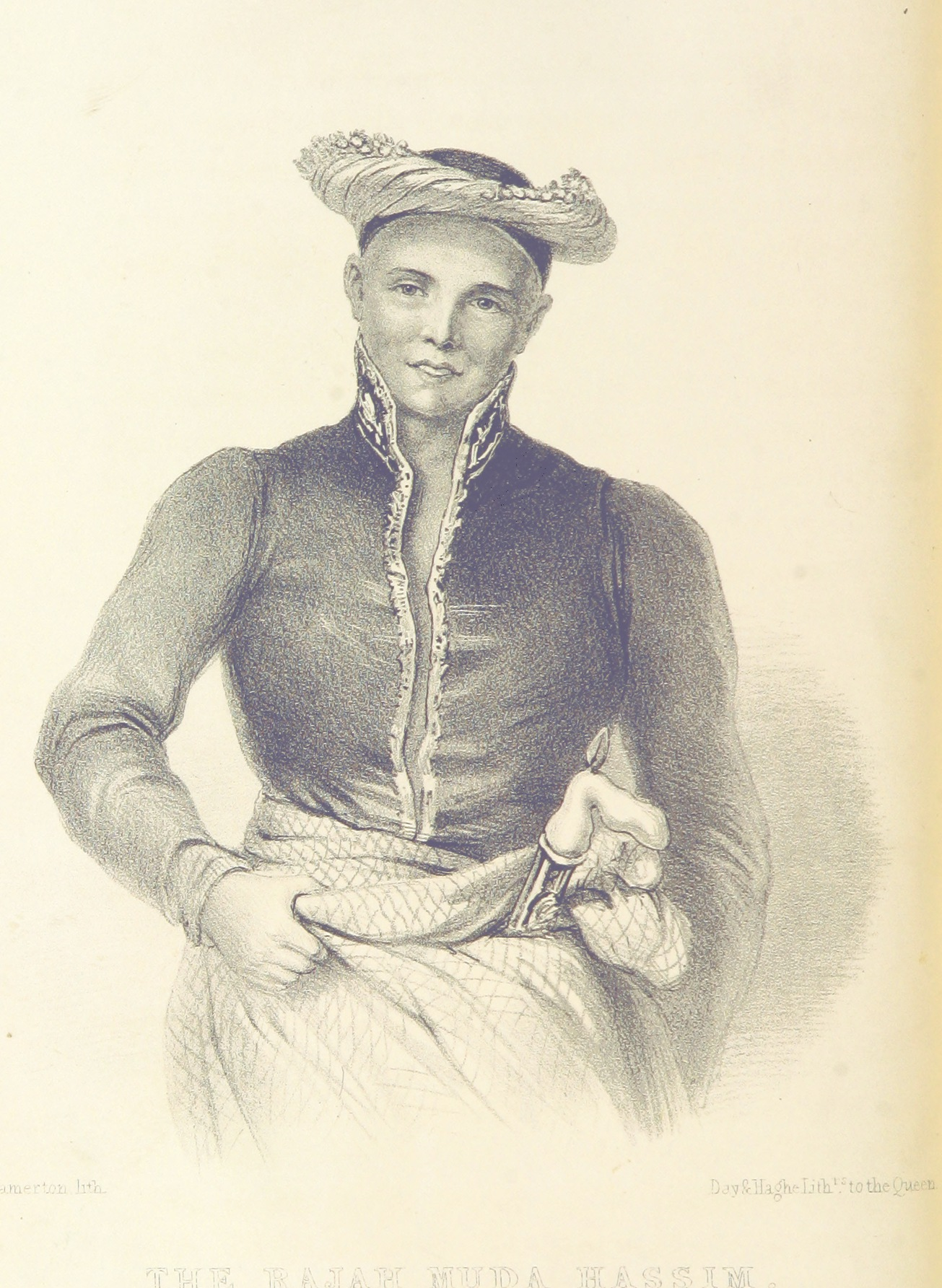
- Born: late 1790s Sambas, West Kalimantan, Bruneian Sultanate
- Died: 1858; Lubai River, Limbang, Bruneian Sultanate
- Burial: Kianggeh Muslim Cemetery
Names
- Pengiran Mohammad Salleh ibnu Pengiran Sharifuddin
Regnal name
- Pengiran Shahbandar Pengiran Mohammad Salleh ibnu Pengiran Sharmayuda Pengiran Sharifuddin
- House: Bolkiah
- Religion: Sunni Islam

Pengiran Mohammad Salleh ibnu Pengiran Sharifuddin (1790s–1858) or commonly referred to by his title Pengiran Indera Mahkota, was a Bruneian nobleman and politician who was governor of Sarawak in 1827. He founded the city of Kuching in 1827 in what is now Sarawak.

== Early life and education ==
Pengiran Salleh was born around the late 1790s, and grew up in Sambas. His father was Pengiran Sharmayuda with ancestral links to Sultan Abdul Hakkul Mubin and his mother was Raden Kencana, daughter of Sultan Umar Aqamaddin II of Sambas. A mosque was erected with the money obtained from gold mining, to the right of Sultan Umara Aqamaddin II's palace, named Kamashaiaita Mosque. The Malay sultanates were subject of the conflict in the archipelago at that time were the Sultanates of Sambas and Brunei. This shaped Pengiran Salleh as he grew up in this environment. He is reported to have attended school in Batavia (Jakarta) while residing in Sambas and to have visited the Netherlands once. This demonstrates that he was a knowledgeable individual with extensive experience, an open mind, and a long-term perspective.

== Personality ==
Pengiran Salleh was cunning, as James Brooke admitted in his notebook. Moreover, James Brooke was also aware of his inventiveness and lofty thoughts. Spenser St. John, among other authors, describes his personality and method of thinking in his book The Life of Sir James Brooke as follows: "He was probably the most intelligent Malay whom we ever met in Borneo, frank and open in manner, but looked upon us the most cunning of the raja's advisers. He was much puzzled, as were indeed all the nobles, as to the true subject of Brooke's visit to Borneo." Like all the lords, he was quite perplexed about the real purpose of Brooke's trip to Borneo. While T. Pringle stated that he was "His education has been more attended to the than another of his own rank. He both reads and writes his own language, and is well acquainted with the government, laws and custom of Boreno" in his book Rajah and Rebels (1970).

Captain Rodney Mundy, in 'Narrative of Events in Borneo.. Journals of James Brooke' quotes James Brooke's personal observations about Pengiran Salleh as follows: ''I (James Brooke) may be excused a brief description of Mahkota, (Pengiran Shahbandar Mohammad Salleh) a man of much ability and seemingly free from the common faults of his countryman. His appearance is plain, but good-humored and intelligent; and his countenance has few traces of a Malay accent. His manner, schooled, perhaps, by subtle dissimulation, seems at once lively, frank and engaging; his descriptions of countries and people are so graphic that he is difficult to doubt their fidelity. He openly stated the reason for his visit, which was to discuss with me the future conduct of the trade of this place. He talked a lot and well of the English and Dutch; informed me that the latter had offered to assist him in opening the mines. He represented this province as rich in ores and other commodities.''

== Governor of Sarawak ==
Sultan Muhammad Kanzul Alam, who was in power in 1820, summoned Pengiran Salleh to return to Brunei. He was then given the title Pengiran Indera Mahkota by the Sultan, and gained the moniker Pengiran Indera Mahkota after it. Later in 1827, he was assigned the responsibility of serving as the Sultan of Brunei's representative as head of government or Governor of Sarawak. He was the one who originally established Kuching at Lidah Tanah. Sarawak grew under his leadership by exporting antimony, he expanded its commerce and raised its income. The locals rose up in rebellion against him in 1839, led by Datu Patinggi Ali, as a result of his tyrannical reign. Pengiran Muda Hashim, the son of Sultan Muhammad Kanzul Alam, was dispatched by Brunei to quell the uprising. James Brooke also went there, drawn by the region's wealth. Due to a long-standing grudge he held towards Pengiran Salleh, Pengiran Muda Hashim requested Brooke's help. Pengiran Muda Hashim had visited Kuching five years prior, but Pengiran he had not personally greeted him upon his arrival.

=== Arrival of James Brooke ===
When James Brooke arrived in Sarawak in August 1839, Pengiran Salleh, who was serving as the Sultan of Brunei's ambassador in Sarawak and was living in Kuching, paid a nighttime visit to James Brooke's ship. James Brooke discovered him conversing in Dutch and English inside the ship called Royalist. He stayed and talked aboard the ship after dark till ten o'clock. James Brooke first refused to aid Pengiran Muda Hashim, but the next year he changed his mind after being promised the governorship of Sarawak in lieu of Pengiran Salleh if he could put a stop to the uprising. Although Brooke was successful in putting a stop to the uprising, he was not given the governorship until he forced the matter in 1841. As Governor of Brunei in 1842, Brooke sailed there in return for a yearly payment.

Pengiran Salleh avoided being swayed by James Brooke. Instead, James Brooke saw him as a threat to his scheme to seize control of Sarawak. The commitment made between James Brooke and Pengiran Muda Hashim was known to him, who perceived it as a threat that may result in Brunei being smaller and weaker. He came up with a number of strategies to remove James Brooke from Sarawak. Perhaps it was because of this mentality that some historians viewed him as being despotic. James Brooke had threatened to murder Pengiran Indera Mahkota's supporters if Pengiran Muda Hashim didn't quickly keep his word as a result of Pengiran Salleh's conduct. The warning was issued on 24 September 1841, as Pengiran Salleh had garnered local support in numerous river cities in Sarawak later in the mid-19th century. He was compelled to appoint James Brooke as the ruler of Sarawak on that day. He took this action to stop violence in the nation.

=== Assassination plot ===
James Brooke wasn't named Raja Sarawak by the Sultan of Brunei until 1 August 1842. Pengiran Salleh was upset by the appointment since his position as Governor of Sarawak had not yet been terminated. He left Sarawak in light of this and traveled to Batang Lupar, then continued down the coast of Sarawak until landing at Mukah. He remained in Mukah for a while and didn't return to Brunei until 1845, when he was called back by Pengiran Anak Abdul Momin, the Sultan's son-in-law and personal assistant. He began writing Syair Rakis while en route to Brunei, and after spending some time there, he finished it. Both Pengiran Anak Abdul Momin and Sultan Omar Ali Saifuddien II received copies of his book.

The twenty-fourth Sultan of Brunei, Pengiran Anak Abdul Momin, was crowned after the death of Sultan Omar Ali Saifuddien II in 1852. Pengiran Indera Mahkota received one of the greatest honors in Brunei at the time—Pengiran Shahbandar—from Sultan Abdul Momin. James Brooke was aware of Brunei's progress, and Pengiran Salleh's presence in Brunei caused him some anxiety. James Brooke used intermediaries to get rid of him, allegedly including an uprising in Limbang. The family of Pengiran Muda Hashim proposed that Pengiran Salleh should lead an army to Limbang to quell the uprising that was rumored to have broken out there at James Brooke's urging.

== Death ==
Pengiran Salleh, who could not swim, drowned when his boat capsized on the route to Limbang at a spot called Lubai. On 1858, he was buried at Kianggeh. There are conflicting sources on the story such as, claims that he was buried in Lubok Madung in Sambas, and him being strangled to death by his opponents. Nearly all writers from the west have indicated that his death in Limbang was brought on by his flings with Bisaya women.

== Syair Rakis ==
Pengiran Salleh's mother was of Sambas royalty. Many Chinese traveled in large numbers to Sambas to dig gold during her father's rule. Gold had also been discovered in some of Sambas's regions, including the Monteradu District, Lara, Lumar, and Simanis. The Sultanate of Sambas was in charge of all of those lands. The Chinese possessed knowledge and expertise in gold mining at that time in Southeast Asia. Therefore, it is not unexpected that Pengiran Salleh captures the following occurrence in stanzas 42 and 43 of his Syair Rakis. Syair Rakis by him has 175 total stanzas. Except for stanza 170, which has just two speech pieces, every stanza of the poem by Syair Rakis includes four speech sections.

Through the publication of his book, "Menyuruki Syair Rakis" (UBD, 2006), Prof. Associate Dr. Haji Hashim bin Haji Abdul Hamid makes the following assumptions on the composition date of this Syair Rakis: "This Syair Rakis was presented by Pengiran Shahbandar Mohammad Salleh ibnu Pengiran Sharmayuda to Sultan Abdul Momin as his hand after traveling for many years in the land of people. Actually, Pengiran Shahbandar Mohammad Salleh ibnu Pengiran Sharmayuda was the Sultan of Brunei's representative to become the ruler of Sarawak, but when James Brooke was appointed to replace him without his own knowledge, he migrated to Mukah. Before that there was opposition from him on James Brooke, unfortunately failed. And when Sultan Abdul Momin invited him back to Brunei, the poem was written on the return voyage, which was approximately in 1843 / 1844. This poem was not only read by the Sultan at that time, but also by the dignitaries of the country, and even copied by the public. Considering his excellence, he was given the title of Pengiran Shahbandar (previously he was titled Pengiran Indera Mahkota)." While Jamil Al-Sufri stated: "Pengiran Indera Mahkota composed Raks' poetry while traveling from Mukah to Brunei and was subsequently worshiped to Sultan Omar Ali Saifuddien II (1828–1852)." It hasn't yet been established that Syair Rakis was indeed composed in 1843 or 1844 while traveling back from Mukah to Brunei.

== Titles ==
- 1820 – 1852: Pengiran Indera Mahkota
- 1852 – 1858: Pengiran Shahbandar
