= Pengiran Muda Hashim =

Bruneian nobility

Hashim هشيم
- Pengiran Bendahara
- Born: Bruneian Sultanate
- Died: 1846
- House: Bolkiah; Digadong
- Father: Muhammad Kanzul Alam
- Mother: Pengiran Anak Salamah
- Religion: Islam

Pengiran Muda Hashim (died 1846) or sometimes referred to by Raja Muda Hashim, was a Bruneian prince who was the son of Sultan Muhammad Kanzul Alam, and uncle to Sultan Omar Ali Saifuddin II.

== Sarawak ==
Upon hearing of Ali's rebellion, Pengiran Muda Hashim was dispatched to Sarawak by the Sultan in the early 1835s to bring about order. At the beginning of the 19th century, Brunei held jurisdiction over Sarawak, which was a region with slack governance. At that time, Pengiran Indera Mahkota, the Malay governor of Sarawak chosen by Brunei, was facing a rebellion by an anti-Brunei group of Malays and Bidayuhs commanded by Datu Patinggi Ali. According to some sources, Mahkota was a stern guy who had the natives in Sarawak labor as slaves to harvest antimony from the mines. Hence the revolt. Even yet, for a few years after Pengiran Muda Hashim's arrival in Sarawak, not much transpired and neither side made much headway. Additionally, it looks like he and Pengiran Indera Mahkota were at odds with one another, which led to some friction between them.

=== Arrival of James Brooke ===
James Brooke, an English explorer, learned that Hashim, the monarch of Sarawak, had demonstrated his friendliness toward Europeans when he arrived in Singapore on his expedition to the Far East. Some British sailors who had been shipwrecked in Sarawak's coastal waters before had been welcomed by him, who even sent them back to Singapore. James Brooke was interested in learning more about the rumored Borneo. Additionally, George Bonham, the British Governor of Singapore, requested that James convey to Pengiran Muda Hashim a letter of appreciation and some gifts for his kind treatment of the seamen. Brooke sailed his schooner "Royalist" up the Sarawak River and moored off Kuching on 15 August 1839, and James was welcomed by him warmly.

Pengiran Muda Hashim's initial encounter was described by one author as follows: "His appearance was not imposing but his manners were a pattern of courtesy and he maintained a certain shabby dignity. He returned the Royalist's salute of 21 guns with a salute of 17 and received his visitor with some pomp in the palm-leaf shed which went by the name of audience hall". Overall, their interactions were cordial enough that Hashim did solicit his assistance in putting down the rebels, but James Brooke declined since he didn't want to become involved. He stayed just briefly before leaving.

=== Contract with James Brooke ===
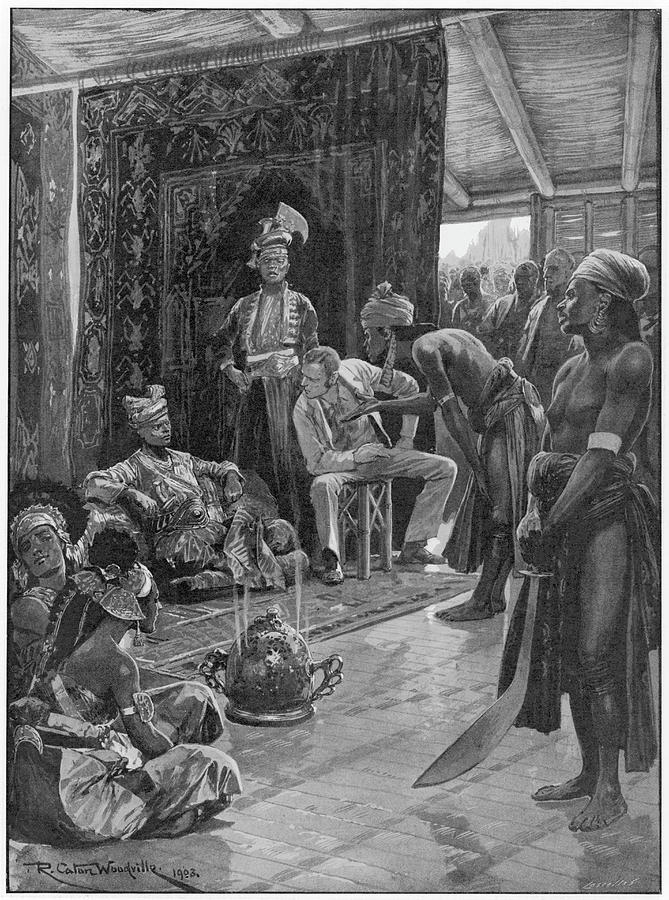
Muda Hashim negotiating with James Brooke

After a year of island-hopping, James Brooke made the decision to head back to England. He believed he would return to Kuching first, though, before proceeding. He returned to Sarawak on 29 August 1840 and saw that the warfare had not stopped. He decided to help this time when Pengiran Muda Hashim requested. James was able to put an end to the Datu Patinggi Ali-led uprising with the help of his powerful cannons and skillful military strategies. As a return for his accomplishments, Hashim signed a contract on 24 September 1841, giving Brooke the position of Raj of Sarawak and land from the westernmost point of Sarawak, Tanjung Datu, to the Samarahan river. On 18 September 1842, Sultan Omar Ali Saifuddin II made this appointment official. In exchange, Brooke agreed to keep Sarawak's traditions and religion intact, to give the Sultan an annual tribute of $2,500, and to refrain from separating Sarawak from Brunei without the Sultan's permission. The Sultan made a serious political error in appointing Brooke, but the Englishman had the support of the Royal Navy.

=== Assassination plot ===
James Brooke and Sir Edward Belcher, a British naval commander, followed Pengiran Muda Hashim when he traveled back to Brunei from Sarawak in 1844. He had fallen from grace at home while he was in Sarawak as a result of a palace coup in Brunei. In his absence, his rival Pengiran Muhammad Yusuf (Usop) had become Bendahara. During that visit, Hashim was re-installed as the new Bendahara by Brooke and the British Naval Forces. Additionally, he received official approval to succeed the current Sultan of Brunei. Pengiran Temenggong Pengiran Anak Hashim, the son of Sultan Omar Ali Saifuddin II, was enraged by this, and he subsequently planned to assassinate Pengiran Muda Hashim.

== Death ==
Pengiran Muda Hashim appeared to be the reliable person James Brooke needed in Brunei. The British also succeeded in convincing Brunei to agree to hand up Labuan to them as well as to demolish the protective forts on Pulau Cermin and along the Brunei River. The British fleet, led by Rear Admiral Thomas Cochrane, invaded Brunei town in 1846 after Pengiran Muda Hashim and his family had been killed by Pengiran Muhammad Yusuf's forces by the orders of the Sultan. Sultan Omar Ali Saifuddin II, was responsible for the assassination of Pengiran Muda Hashim, a close friend and ally of Brooke, in the early months of 1846. Brooke vowed to avenge the killing.

== Personal life ==
Pengiran Muda Hashim had a child named, Pengiran Anak Chuchu Damit Muhammad Tajuddin.

== Namesakes ==
- Jalan Muda Hashim, a road in Kuching.
