= Datu Patinggi Ali =

Rebel Leader of the Sarawak Uprising

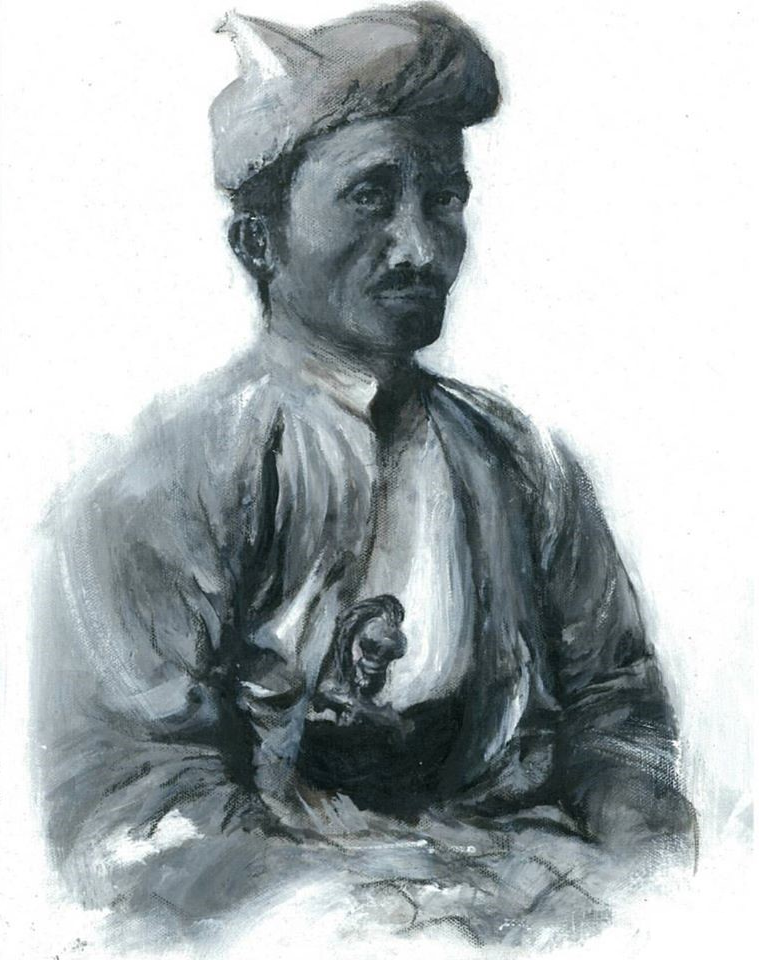
- An illustration of Datu Patinggi Ali
- Born: Abang Ali bin Abang Amir; Sarawak
- Died: 1844 near Lupar River, Sarawak, British Borneo
- Known for: Leading the Sarawak rebellion against the Brunei Empire
- Successor: Datu Patinggi Abdul Gapor
- Children: List: Datu Bandar Muhammad Lana; Datu Bandar Bua Hasan; Dayang Inda
- Parents: Datu Patinggi Amir (father); Dayang Yong (mother)

Datu Patinggi Abang Ali bin Abang Amir (commonly known as Datu Patinggi Ali) was a key figure in the Sarawak Malays' resistance against the Brunei Empire, which occurred throughout Pengiran Indera Mahkota and Raja Muda Hashim's reigns in the 1830s. He became one of the first supporters of the Brooke Raj and was hailed as Sarawak's first national hero. He played an important role in the 1830s uprising against Bruneian authority. In an endeavor to oppose Brunei's attempts to subjugate Sarawak through local leaders, he was described by contemporaries as a determined and courageous leader. After the Sarawak dispute ended, Brooke appointed Ali as his aide-de-camp.

== Early life ==
The origins of Ali are disputed. Sarawak Malays asserted that he had descended from the Minangkabau Kingdom, which once existed in Sumatra, Indonesia. A prince of the Royal House of Minangkabau, Datu Undi (also called Raja Jarom) moved to Borneo with his people and settled near the Sarawak River. Raja Jarom had seven children, and the oldest daughter married a Javanese royal prince. Malays claim that Ali was descended directly from them. Utusan Sarawak states that he is a descendant of the early leader of Sarawak who was centered in Santubong, namely Datu Merpati.

Antimony ore was discovered in Siniawan and Jambusan in 1823. The Bruneian sultan had appointed Ali as the governor of Sarawak in the 1820s. The Chinese mined antimony ore in Siniawan, while the Malays who resided in the Tonga Tanah used Bidayuh laborers. However, as soon as Sultan Omar Ali Saifuddin II Brunei realized that antimony ore and gold had been discovered in the Bau area, the Sultan named Pengiran Indera Mahkota as the new Governor of Sarawak in 1827, replacing Datu Patinggi Ali, allowing Brunei to take control of the antimony mines and commerce. The administrative center of Sarawak was relocated by Pengiran Indera Mahkota in 1826 from Lidah Tanah to Santubong and subsequently to Kuching. It is said that he moved the administrative center to Kuching using the fear of pirates as justification. However, a deliberate measure was taken to lessen Ali's influence and authority. The full control of the mining activities and antimony trade in Bau was made feasible by Pengiran Indera Mahkota when they seized power from Ali to govern Sarawak.

Mullen, a supporter of Ali, said that Bidayuh and Malays were made to work long hours in the antimony mine. Before Pengiran Indera Mahkota arrived, he had been in charge of them for a considerable time. When he saw the misery of his followers—who were compelled to labor at Pengiran Indera Mahkota's antimony mine—he was reportedly angered. The insistence of Pengiran Indera Mahkota that his followers pay extremely high taxes infuriated Ali even more. Additionally, because Pengiran Indera Mahkota controlled all commercial activity, they could not trade as freely as before.

=== Sarawak Uprising of 1836 ===
Following 10 years of hardship as a slave worker, Ali rallied his supporters from Siniawan to oppose Pengiran Indera Mahkota. They began to resist in 1836. Datu Bandar, Datu Amar, and Datu Temenggong helped Ali. Patinggi Ali, one of Datu's disciples, first constructed defense fortifications in Siniawan, Lidah Tanah, and other locations—an additional location upstream Bau. They aimed to remove the Bruneian governor and liberate Sarawak from the Sultanate of Brunei's rule. In addition to setting up battle plans, he offered them encouragement and counsel. They put up a fierce fight against Pengiran Indera Makkota but despite several battles but were unable to vanquish him. Ali was also defeated by him.

This conflict persisted and worsened in 1838 and into 1839. Ali received assistance, as the Sambas Sultan had pledged. Additionally, there was material indicating that the Kalimantan Dutch had prepared to assist the people of the Bau area in defeating the Pengiran Indera Mahkota. Pengiran Muda Hashim understood how tough it would be to overcome Ali's troops. James Brooke, an English traveler in Kuching at the time, was approached for assistance. Brooke and a few other Royalist crew members sailed up the Sarawak River to Siniawan in 1840. The ship was outfitted with contemporary weaponry. There were several conflicts and occasionally discussions with Ali. At last, Brooke was said to have defeated Ali's army at the Lidah Tanah citadel with 600 part-time troops who were Iban, Malay, and Chinese.

The scarcity of food supplies at the time forced Ali's supporters to flee, and many of them—particularly the Bidayuh people—starved to death. The fact that Datu Patinggi Abdul Gapur and Datu Tumanggong Mersal fled to Sambas and Datu Patinggi Ali sought safety in Sarikei after Brooke put an end to the uprising demonstrated the Sultanate of Sambas' sympathy for the rebels. By late 1840, Datu Patinggi Ali had promised to terminate the conflict, but only if Pengiran Indera Mahkota and his family left Kuching. They were spared along with him and his supporters. The conflict with Pengiran Indera Mahkota ended with the aforesaid arrangement. In the end, he and his supporters were able to drive Pengiran Indera Mahkota and his family from Sarawak. At Belidah in December 1840, he submitted, knowing that Brooke would go on to rule an independent Sarawak, with the idea that Brooke would take over the role of Raja and put an end to his oppression by the Brunei Pengirans.

=== Later life and death ===
Following Brooke's coronation as Rajah of Sarawak on 24 September 1841, he restored Ali to his position as the chief of the Sarawak Malays. He worked for the government as a well-known warrior for James Brooke from 1841 until 1844. Additionally, Ali assisted Brooke in prosecuting Saribas and Skrang inhabitants who were thought to have committed pelation. He fought in an 1844 excursion to the upper Batang Lupar River with volunteers. He forced the other seven prahus to retreat after capturing one during their first encounter. He was later killed in Skrang during the Anglo-Bruneian War, along with 30 of his comrades, in an ambush by troops led by Rentap. His exit from the Brooke administration did not, however, end his legacy or his position in the administration, as Datu Patinggi Ali's children rose to prominence in the realm. Among them was his son-in-law, Datu Patinggi Abdul Gapor, who succeeded Datu Patinggi Ali as the principal Malay leader throughout his upbringing. Unlike Ali, Abdul Ghapur's inauguration caused disapproval among his royal servants.

== Personal life ==
Ali was the son of Abang Amir bin Datu Patinggi Abang Hashim and Dayang Yong. He married Dayang Turyah, a Sarawakian woman. Together they had nine children.

Datu Patinggi Ali had several children; Muhammad Lana (later Datu Bandar) and Bua Hasan (later Datu Bandar). His grandchildren were Abang Kassim (son of Muhammad Lana; later Datu Muda) and Muhammad Ali (son of Bua Hasan; later Datu Hakim). Datu Patinggi Abdul Gapor would go on to marry his daughter, Dayang Inda.

Additionally, some other names belong to Kuching local authorities who are descended from the Datu Patinggi Ali dynasty. The title of Datu Imam is held by a number of his children as well as other brothers including Abdul Karim and Muhammad Taim. Among his great-grandchildren is Datu Patinggi Abdillah (grandson of Bua Hasan).

== Legacy ==
Situated in the seas of the Malaysian Economic Zone, Betting Patinggi Ali (Patinggi Ali Shoal) is located 84 nanometres (3.3×10^{−6} in) from the Miri shoreline, precisely in Tanjung Baram, Sarawak.

A road in Kuching is named in honour of him, Jalan Patinggi Ali.
