= Ibu Pertiwiku =

State anthem of Sarawak, Malaysia

- Coat of arms of Sarawak
- State anthem of Sarawak
- Lyrics: Dato' Haji Wan Othman; Ismail Hassan
- Music: Dato' Haji Wan Othman
- Adopted: 1988

Audio sample
- "Ibu Pertiwiku" (instrumental): file; help

"Ibu Pertiwiku" (chorus)
New arrangement of Ibu Pertiwiku

Ibu Pertiwiku (English: My Motherland) is the official state anthem of Sarawak, Malaysia. The song was adopted in 1988, alongside the adoption of the new State Flag as well, in conjunction with the 25th anniversary of Sarawak's Independence within Malaysia. The music was composed by Sarawak songwriter Dato' Haji Wan Othman, while the lyrics were written by Ismail Hassan.

== Lyrics ==
Malay [Original]

Sarawak tanah airku,
Negeriku, tanah airku, Sarawak,
Engkaulah tanah pusakaku,
Tanah tumpah darahku,
Ibu Pertiwiku.

Rakyat hidup mesra dan bahagia,
Damai muhibbah sentiasa.
Bersatu, Berusaha, Berbakti,
Untuk Sarawak kucintai.

Sarawak Dalam Malaysia
Aman makmur Rahmat Tuhan Maha Esa.
Kekallah Sarawak bertuah,
Teras perjuangan rakyat,
Berjaya Berdaulat!

Jawi Version

سراوق تانه اءيرکو⹁
نݢريکو تانه اءيرکو⹁ سراوق⹁
اڠکاوله تانه ڤوساککو⹁
تانه تومڤه دارهکو⹁
ايبو ڤرتيويکو.

رعيت هيدوڤ مسرا دان بهاݢيا⹁
داماي محبه سنتياس.
برساتو⹁ براوسها⹁ بربقتي⹁
اونتوق سراوق کوچينتاءي.

سراوق دالم مليسيا,
امان معمور رحمة توهن مها اسا.
ککلله سراوق برتواه⹁
ترس ڤرجواڠن رعيت⹁
برجاي بردولت!

IPA transcription (Note: See Help:IPA/Malay.)

[sa.ra.waʔ ta.nah a.ir.ku]
[nə.gə.ri.ku ta.nah a.ir.ku sa.ra.waʔ]
[əŋ.kau.lah ta.nah pu.sa.ka.ku]
[ta.nah tum.pah da.rah.ku]
[i.bu pər.ti.wi.ku]

[raʔ.jat hi.dup məs.ra dan ba.ha.gi.a]
[da.mai mu.hi.bah sən.ti.a.sa]
[bər.sa.tu bə.ru.sa.ha bər.baʔ.ti]
[un.tuʔ sa.ra.waʔ ku.t͡ʃin.ta.i]

[sa.ra.waʔ da.lam mə.le.sia]
[a.man maʔ.mur rah.mat tu.han ma.ha e.sa]
[kə.ka(l).lah sa.ra.waʔ bər.tu.ah]
[tə.ras pər.d͡ʒua.ŋan raʔ.jat]
[bər.d͡ʒa.ja bər.dau.lat]

Literal English Translation

Sarawak, my homeland
My state, my homeland, Sarawak
You are the Land of my native soil
The Land where my blood flows
My Motherland.

Citizens live happily and in harmony
Peaceful, always cooperative (with each other)
United, Striving, Service
For my beloved Sarawak.

Sarawak, part of Malaysia
Blessed by God with peace and prosperity
Forever may Sarawak be blessed
Through the people's effort
Be successful and free!

== Timeline ==
Historical national, colonial and state anthems
Name	Date	Notes
Ibu Pertiwiku	1988–present	Current State Anthem Of Sarawak
Sarawak Bahagia	1973–1988	Second State Anthem Of Sarawak
Fair Land Sarawak	1946–1973	Anthem of the Crown Colony of Sarawak and the First State Anthem of Sarawak.
Gone Forth Beyond The Sea	1872–1946	Anthem of the Raj of Sarawak.

== Previous State Anthems ==
Sarawak had adopted 3 anthems prior: Gone Forth Beyond the Sea (National), Fair Land Sarawak (Colonial and State) and Sarawak Bahagia (State).

=== Sarawak Bahagia ===
Sound clip of the Anthem.

"Sarawak Bahagia" (Happy Sarawak) was the state anthem of Sarawak from 1973 until 1988. It was the first anthem in the state to be rendered in Malay language. the Music of the Anthem composed by Mohd Bin Daud.

Original [Malay]	IPA transcription (Note: See Help:IPA/Malay.)	English Translation
Sarawak negeriku berdaulat merdeka Rakyatnya hidup teguh bersatu padu Semua berazam terus berkhidmat pada negara Sentiasa maju pertiwi Bahagialah tanah airku Sarawak negeri yang ku cinta ku puja Untukmu ku rela korban jiwa raga Abadikan Sarawak ya Tuhan dalam Malaysia	[sa.ra.waʔ nə.gə.ri.ku bər.dau.lat mər.de.ka] [raʔ.jat.ɲa hi.dup tə.guh bər.sa.tu pa.du] [sə.mu.a bə.ra.zam tə.rus bər.xid.mat pa.da nə.ga.ra] [sən.ti.a.sa ma.d͡ʒu pər.ti.wi] [ba.ha.gi.a.lah ta.nah a.ir.ku] [sa.ra.waʔ nə.gə.ri jaŋ ku t͡ʃin.ta ku pu.d͡ʒa] [un.tuʔ.mu ku re.la kor.ban d͡ʒi.wa ra.ga] [a.ba.di.kan sa.ra.waʔ ja tu.han da.lam mə.le.sia]	Sarawak, my land, sovereign and free Where the people live united All of them are dedicated to serve the country Always progress my Motherland Be happy my homeland Sarawak, the land I love and adore To you will I give my life May God keep Sarawak in Malaysia

=== Fair Land Sarawak ===
Sound Clip of the Anthem.

"Fair Land Sarawak" was the anthem of Sarawak as a British Crown Colony from 1946 until 1963 and the anthem of Sarawak as a state of Malaysia from 1963 until 1973. The lyrics of the anthem were provided by F.C. Ogden, while the tune of the anthem provided by George R.K. Freeth, is identical to that of the anthem of the Raj of Sarawak – "Gone Forth Beyond the Sea".

Lyrics
Fair Land Sarawak

We will never cease to honour thee

And with our loyal sons defend your liberty

From you high forest hills, Down to the open sea

May freedom ever reign Men live in unity

Proudly our Flag flies high above our country strong and free

Long may our peoples live in peace and harmony

=== Gone Forth Beyond the Sea ===
"Gone Forth Beyond the Sea" was the national anthem of the Raj of Sarawak. It was composed in 1872 by Margaret of Sarawak, in honour of Charles of Sarawak, and was in use until the Raj was ceded to the United Kingdom in 1946 and become its crown colony.

One vinyl record of it is on permanent exhibition by the Brooke Heritage Trust managed by Margaret's great great grandson Jason at the Kuching Old Courthouse.

Lyrics
Gone forth beyond the sea
To clime... as yet unknown,
Where calls are made for thee,
To bear the sword and crown.

Advance, God speed, to save,
Creatures in jungles deep,
God's hand shall help the brave,
Tho'man's may rest in sleep,
Let Justice signalise,
And ev'..ry voice resound,
A brave man's enterprise,
Who by the Eastern crown'd.

Tho' danger may encroach,
And envious tongues draw near,
Such evils will approach,
To threaten thy career.
Stand fast and only heed,
Those calls beyond the sea
Shall always help in need,
And ever prey for thee.

Tho'past and gone in light,
Thy name is still renownd,
And as a chief in might,
Thy deeds are ever crown'd,
Let echoing vales redound,
By mountain, crag and nook,
Sing loud with joyous sound,
God Bless the Rajah Brooke.

== See also ==
- Ibu Pertiwi
