= Kuching Old Courthouse =

Courthouse in Kuching, Sarawak, Malaysia

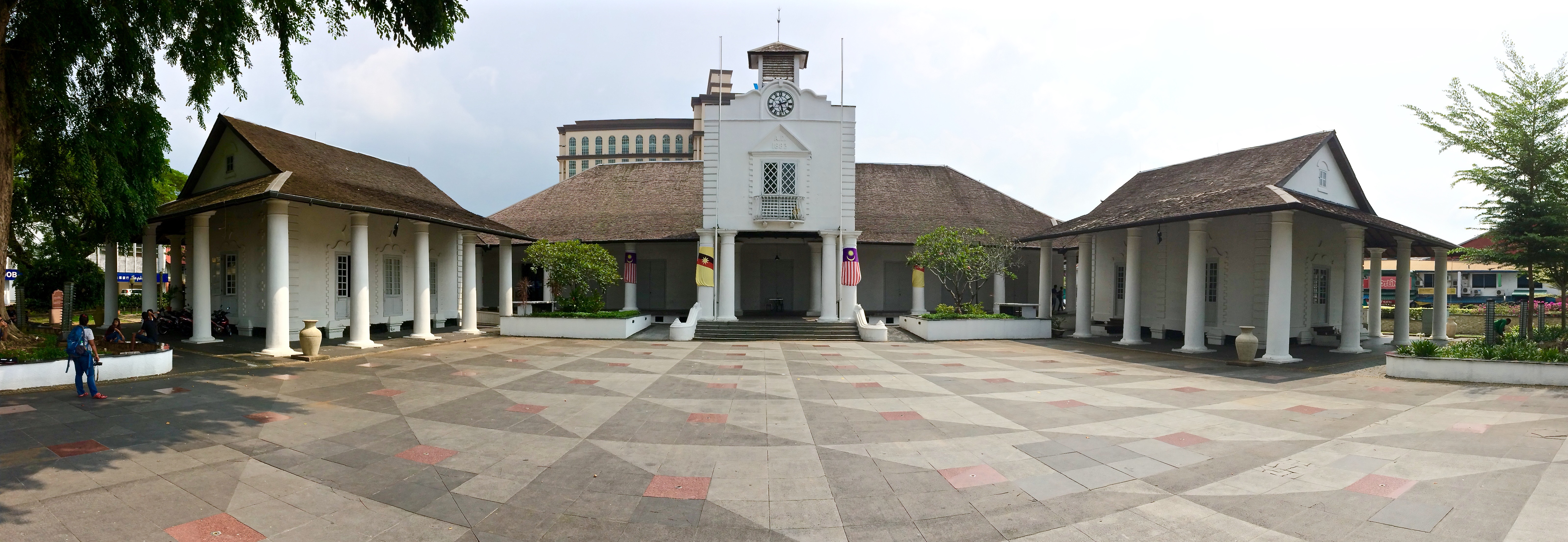

General information
- Type: former courthouse
- Location: Kuching, Sarawak, Malaysia
- Coordinates: 1°33′34.3″N 110°20′41.7″E
- Construction started: 1868
- Completed: 1874

The Kuching Old Courthouse is a historical courthouse in Kuching, Sarawak, Malaysia. It was created as a modern administrative centre for Sarawak. From the 1970s, various state administrative departments left it and it was repurposed into a tourism centre in 2003.

== History ==
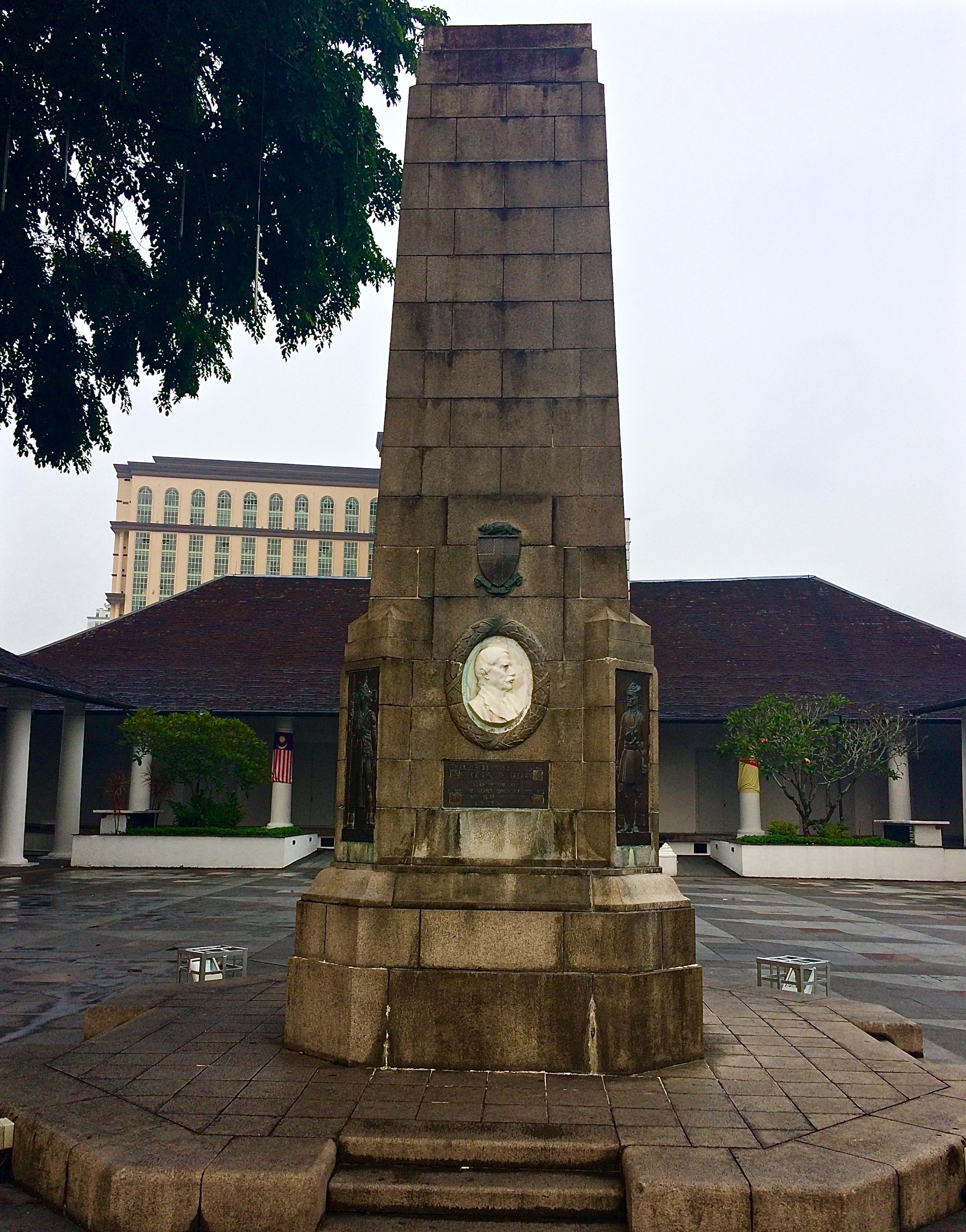
Memorial commemorating the proclamation of Rajah Charles Brooke was erected in 1924.

After Charles Brooke was proclaimed as the Rajah of Sarawak in 1868, he was looking for a better venue for the administrative center of the government of Sarawak. The construction of the courthouse building started in 1868 and completed in 1874, which was then officiated by William Henry Rodway. In 1883, a clock tower was added to the building at the entrance area. In 1924, the memorial for Charles Brooke was constructed at the building entrance square.

It was used as the administrative center for the government of Sarawak until 1973. The court left the building in the 1990s. Following this, it fell into a state of disrepair and was often used by drug dealers. In 2001, the Sarawak Government decided to turn it into a tourism centre and ordered a two year renovation. In 2003, the building was converted into the Sarawak Tourism Complex.

== Architecture ==
The building consists of 4 blocks. It is covered with iron wood roof. It is equipped with various facilities, such as restaurant etc. It predominantly displays exhibits from the White Rajah era under James Brooke. Kuching Old Courthouse is viewed by journalists as a good example of repurposing older buildings for a modern era.

Family heirlooms of the Brooke family were donated by living descendant Jason Brooke director of the Brooke Heritage Trust as part of a permanent exhibition fixture in the building since 2018.

== See also ==
- List of tourist attractions in Malaysia
