= Brooke family =

British family which founded and ruled the Raj of Sarawak

Brooke Family
- Country: Raj of Sarawak
- Founded: 24 September 1841
- Founder: James Brooke
- Current head: Laurence Brooke
- Final ruler: Charles Vyner Brooke
- Deposition: 1 July 1946

The Brooke family is an English family that ruled the Raj of Sarawak, from 1841 until 1 July, 1946, when Charles Vyner Brooke, the third and last "White Rajah" ceded Sarawak to the British Empire due to the lack of resources to finance reconstruction after World War II.

White Rajahs of Sarawak:

- James Brooke (1841–1868)
- Charles Brooke (1868–1917)
- Charles Vyner Brooke (1917–1946)

== Family tree ==
Thomas Brooke
Francis Johnson | Emma Brooke | James Brooke; 1st White Rajah
John Brooke Johnson Brooke; Rajah Muda | Charles Anthoni Johnson Brooke; 2nd White Rajah | George Brooke
Esca Brooke-Daykin | Charles Vyner Brooke; 3rd White Rajah | Bertram Brooke; Tuan Muda
Anthony Brooke; Rajah Muda
James Lionel Brooke
Laurence Brooke | Jason Brooke
