= Castle Huntly (1812 EIC ship) =

Sailing ship of the East India Company launched in 1812

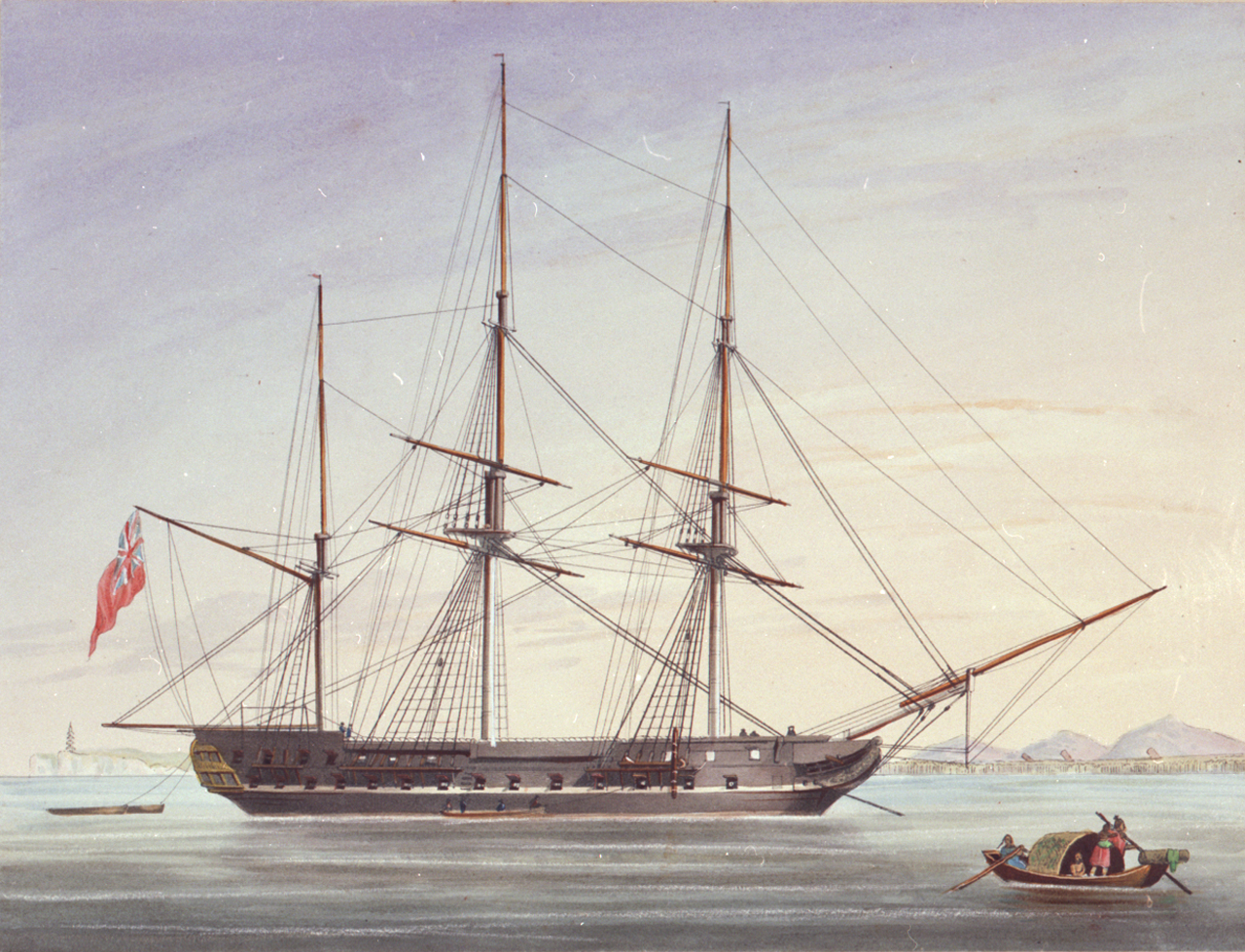
- The Honble Compys Ship Castle Huntley at Anchor

History

United Kingdom
- Name: Abercrombie
- Namesake: Castle Huntly
- Owner: EIC voyages 1-3: Thomas Garland; EIC voyages 4-5: John Paterson; EIC voyages 6-10: John H Gledstanes; EIC voyage 11: James Gardener.
- Operator: British East India Company (EIC)
- Builder: Kyd & Co., Kidderpore, Calcutta
- Launched: 6 November 1812
- Renamed: Castle Huntly prior to launch
- Fate: Wrecked 23 October 1845

General characteristics
- Tons burthen: 1200, or 1257, or 1279, or 1311, or 13118/94, or 1353 (bm)
- Length: Overall: 167 ft 7 3/4 in (51.1 m); Keel: 135 ft 8 in (41.4 m)
- Beam: 42 ft 7 1/2 in (13.0 m)
- Depth of hold: 17 ft 2 in (5.2 m)
- Complement: 120 – 130
- Armament: 26 × 18-pounder guns + 12 × 18-pounder carronades

Castle Huntly was launched at Calcutta in 1812. She then made 11 voyages for the British East India Company as an East Indiaman. After the EIC ceased its shipping business in 1833, new owners continued to sail her between the United Kingdom and China until October 1845 when she was wrecked in the South China Sea.

== Career ==
The EIC contracted with for four voyages by a Castle Huntly at a rate of £19 9s per ton for 1200 tons. Then on 8 December 1810 the EIC contracted with Thomas Garland Murry for a Castle Huntly to be built in Bengal and to conduct six voyages at a rate of £19 9s per ton for 1200 tons, with kintledge, or £20 9s without kintledge.

1st EIC voyage (1812–1813): Captain John Paterson sailed from Kidderpore on 6 November 1812. Castle Huntley left Bengal on 16 February 1813, reached St Helena on 9 June, and arrived at Blackwall on 24 August.

2nd EIC voyage (1814–1815): Captain Paterson acquired a letter of marque on 25 January 1814. He sailed from Portsmouth on 22 February 1814, bound for Madras and China. Castle Huntley reached Madras on 4 July, Penang on 21 August, and Malacca on 15 September; she arrived at Whampoa Anchorage on 1 December. Homeward bound, she crossed the Second Bar on 9 January 1815, reached St Helena on 19 April, and arrived at Long Reach on 25 June.

3rd EIC voyage (1816–1817): Captain Paterson sailed from the Downs on 23 January 1816, bound for Bombay and China. Castle Huntley reached Bombay on 17 May and Malacca on 5 August; she arrived at Whampoa on 3 September. Homeward bound, she crossed the Second Bar on 25 December, reached St Helena on 12 March 1817 and arrived at Long Reach on 16 May.

4th EIC voyage (1818–1819): Captain Henry Andrews Drummond sailed from Portsmouth on 27 March 1818, bound for Bengal and China. Castle Huntley arrived at the New Anchorage on 14 July. Sailing on, she was at Saugor on 2 October and Penang on 31 October; she arrived at Whampoa on 25 January 1819. Homeward bound, she crossed the Second Bar on 22 February, reached St Helena on 24 May, and arrived at Long Reach on 2 August.

5th EIC voyage (1820–1821): Captain Drummond sailed from the Downs on 14 January 1820, bound for Bengal and China. Castle Huntley arrived at the New Anchorage on 17 May. Sailing on, she was at Malacca on 15 August and Singapore on 23 August; she arrived at Whampoa on 9 September. Homeward bound, she crossed the Second Bar on 18 January 1821, reached St Helena on 10 April, and arrived at Long Reach on 8 June.

6th EIC voyage (1822–1823): Captain Drummond sailed from Plymouth on 13 March 1822, bound for Bombay and China. Castle Huntley arrived at Bombay on 11 June. Sailing on, she was at Penang on 22 August and Singapore on 9 September; she arrived at Whampoa on 1 October. Homeward bound, she crossed the Second Bar on 25 December, reached St Helena on 17 March 1823, and arrived at Gravesend on 13 May.

7th EIC voyage (1824–1825): Captain Drummond sailed from Cowes on 14 February 1824, bound for Bombay and China. Castle Huntley arrived at Bombay on 8 June. Sailing on, she was at Singapore on 23 August and arrived at Whampoa on 110 September. Homeward bound, she crossed the Second Bar on 18 December, reached St Helena on 2 March 1825, and arrived at Lower Hope on 28 April.

8th EIC voyage (1826–1827): Captain Drummond sailed from the Downs on 10 March 1826, bound for Madras and China. Castle Huntley arrived at Madras on 17 June. Sailing on, she was at Penang on 16 August and Singapore on 7 September; she arrived at Whampoa on 18 October. Homeward bound, she crossed the Second Bar on 26 December, reached St Helena on 16 March 1827, and arrived at Lower Hope on 12 May.

9th EIC voyage (1828–1829): Captain Thomas Dunkin sailed from the Downs on 24 March 1828, bound for Mauritius and China. Castle Huntley arrived at Port Louis on 17 June. Sailing on, she was at Penang on 24 July and Singapore on 24 August; she arrived at Whampoa on 19 September. Homeward bound, she crossed the Second Bar on 12 December, reached St Helena on 24 April 1827, and arrived at Blackwall on 19 June.

10th EIC voyage (1830–1831): Captain Henry Andrews Drummond sailed from the Downs on 27 March 1830, bound for Madras and China. Castle Huntley arrived at Madras on 17 July.

This 10th voyage had James Brooke, the British soldier and the future first "White Rajah" of Sarawak, as a passenger, returning to India at the end of a 5 year furlough from the Bengal Army. Arriving at Madras on 18 July 1830 he decided that he wouldn't be able to reach his unit in Bengal before the 5 year deadline was up. He resigned his commission in the EIC at Madras and continued travelling with Castle Huntly as it finished its voyage. This journey is what inspired him to make his journey from England in 1838 that led him to become the White Rajah of Sarawak. James writes:

"Castle Huntley, off the Little Carimon Island, September 9, 1830. We shall, wind and weather permitting, be at Singapore tomorrow, and I am credibly informed that letters despatched thence will reach England sooner than those I sent from Madras and Penang. How delightful is the thought of once more meeting you, my loved sister, and meeting you free from the shackles which have bound me! I toss my cap into the air, my commission into the sea, and bid farewell to John Company and all his evil ways. I am like a horse who has got a heavy clog off his neck, and feels himself at liberty to gallop or feed wherever his inclination may prompt. Come what may, I am clear of that creature in Leadenhall Street. Here goes a puff of my cigar, and with it I blow the Company to the devil or anywhere else so they trouble me no further!"

Sailing on, she was at Penang on 22 August, Malacca on 4 September, and Singapore on 11 September; she arrived at Whampoa on 14 October. Homeward bound, she crossed the Second Bar on 15 December, reached St Helena on 27 March 1831, and arrived at Gravesend on 3 June.

On 25 July 1832 the EIC contracted with James Gardner for Castle Huntly, of 1353 tons (bm), for one voyage to China as a "dismantled ship" at a rate of £12 18s per ton.

11th EIC voyage (1833–1834): Captain Charles K. Johnstone sailed from the Downs on 4 March 1833 for Madras, Bengal, and China. Castle Huntley reached Madras on 7 June and Saugor on 27 June. Sailing on, she was at Penang on 12 September, and arrived at Whampoa on 28 October. Homeward bound, she crossed the Second Bar on 25 December, reached St Helena on 17 March 1831, and arrived at Blackwall on 19 May.

The EIC gave up all its commercial shipping activities in 1833, and owners of vessels in its service put their vessels up for sale. On 11 December 1834 Castle Huntly was bought in by her owners for £10,000. Another account gave the amount as £13000, and reported that the purchaser may have been a Parsi merchant.

Castle Huntly, under a sequence of masters, continued to sail between the United Kingdom and India or China. On one of these voyages, in March 1836, she was driven ashore in Tor Bay.

== Fate ==
A gale wrecked Castle Huntley, M'Intyre, master, on 23 October 1845 on Lincoln's Shoal, in the Paracel Islands while she sailing from China to Bombay. (Note: Lincoln's Shoal extends about three to eleven miles south from the south-east point of Lincoln Island (16°40′N 112°44′E).) The passengers, officers, and some 60 of the crew, took to her boats. However, some 40 lascars mutinied and refused to leave the ship. One passenger too remained on board. The boats reached Hainan, and from there the survivors sailed to Canton, being treated with kindness by the Chinese throughout their voyage. (Note: The newspaper account mentions the kindness because at the time there was hostility between the Chinese government and the British.) On 22 December the EIC sent its steam frigate INS Pluto from Canton to search for the men that had stayed aboard the ship. Pluto returned in early January 1846 after a fruitless search. She had found no trace of either Castle Huntly or the men who had stayed.
