= White Rajah =

British dynasty ruling the Raj of Sarawak (1841–1946)

Rajah of Sarawak
- Coat of arms

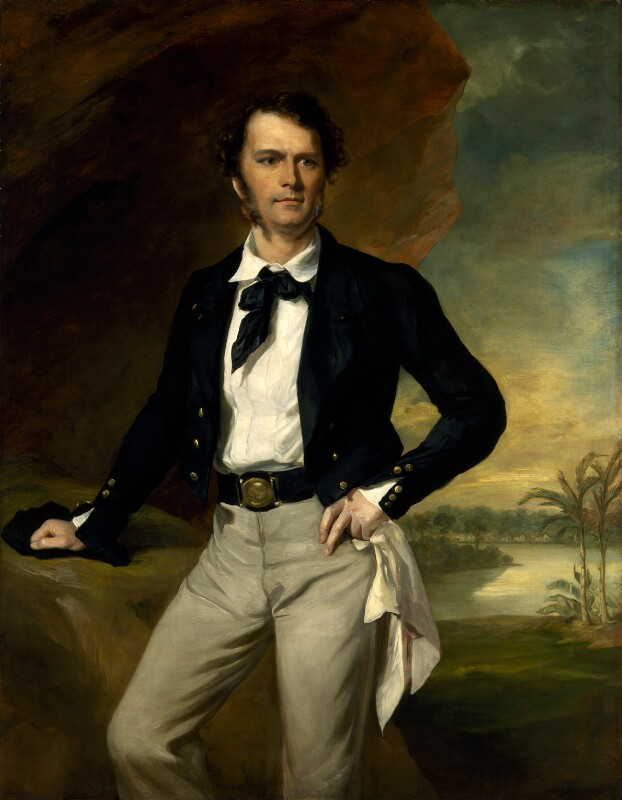
- His Highness Sir James Brooke, 1st White Rajah of Sarawak

Details
- Style: His Highness
- First monarch: James Brooke
- Last monarch: Charles Vyner Brooke
- House: Brooke
- Formed: 1841; 185 years ago
- Abolished: 1946; 80 years ago
- Residences: The Astana, Kuching
- Appointer: Hereditary
- Pretenders: John Brooke Johnson Brooke, Anthony Walter Dayrell Brooke

The White Rajahs of Sarawak were a hereditary monarchy of the Brooke family, who founded and ruled the Raj of Sarawak as a sovereign state, located on the northwest coast of the island of Borneo in Maritime Southeast Asia, from 1841 to 1946. Of British origin, the first ruler, James Brooke was granted the province of Kuching – which was known as Sarawak Asal (Original Sarawak) – by the Sultanate of Brunei for helping fight piracy and insurgency among the indigenous peoples in 1841 and received independent kingdom status.

Based on descent through the male line in accordance with the will of James Brooke, the White Rajahs' dynasty continued through Brooke's nephew and grandnephew, the latter of whom ceded his rights over Sarawak to the British Empire in 1946, which was made a Crown colony. His nephew had been the legal heir to the throne and objected to the cession, as did most of the Sarawak members of the Council Negri.

== Rulers ==
Sarawak was part of the realm of Brunei until 1841 when James Brooke was granted a sizeable area of land in the southwest area of Brunei – around the town of Sarawak (now Kuching) and the nearby mining region of Bau – from Bruneian Sultan Omar Ali Saifuddin II. He was later confirmed with the title of Rajah of the territory. The Raj of Sarawak developed and expanded during the rule of the first two White Rajahs, growing to occupy much of the north region of the island of Borneo. The Brooke administrations leased or annexed more land from Brunei.

Name	Portrait	Birth	Death	Marriages	Succession right
James of Sarawak (James Brooke) (1841–1868)	HH James Brooke, Rajah of Sarawak	29 April 1803, India	11 June 1868, England	Unmarried, but acknowledged an illegitimate son	Granted Sarawak and the title Rajah by the sultan of Brunei
Charles of Sarawak (Charles Johnson/Brooke) (1868–1917)	HH Charles Brooke, Rajah of Sarawak	3 June 1829, England	17 May 1917, England	Dayang Mastiah, one son, Esca; Margaret Alice Lili de Windt, with whom he had six children; three survived infancy More illegitimate children have been suspected but not acknowledged	His uncle James named Charles as his successor in 1865
Vyner of Sarawak (Charles Vyner Brooke) (1917–1946)	HH Charles Vyner Brooke, Rajah of Sarawak	26 September 1874, England	9 May 1963, England	Sylvia Brett, with whom he had three daughters	Son of the preceding, inherited the title

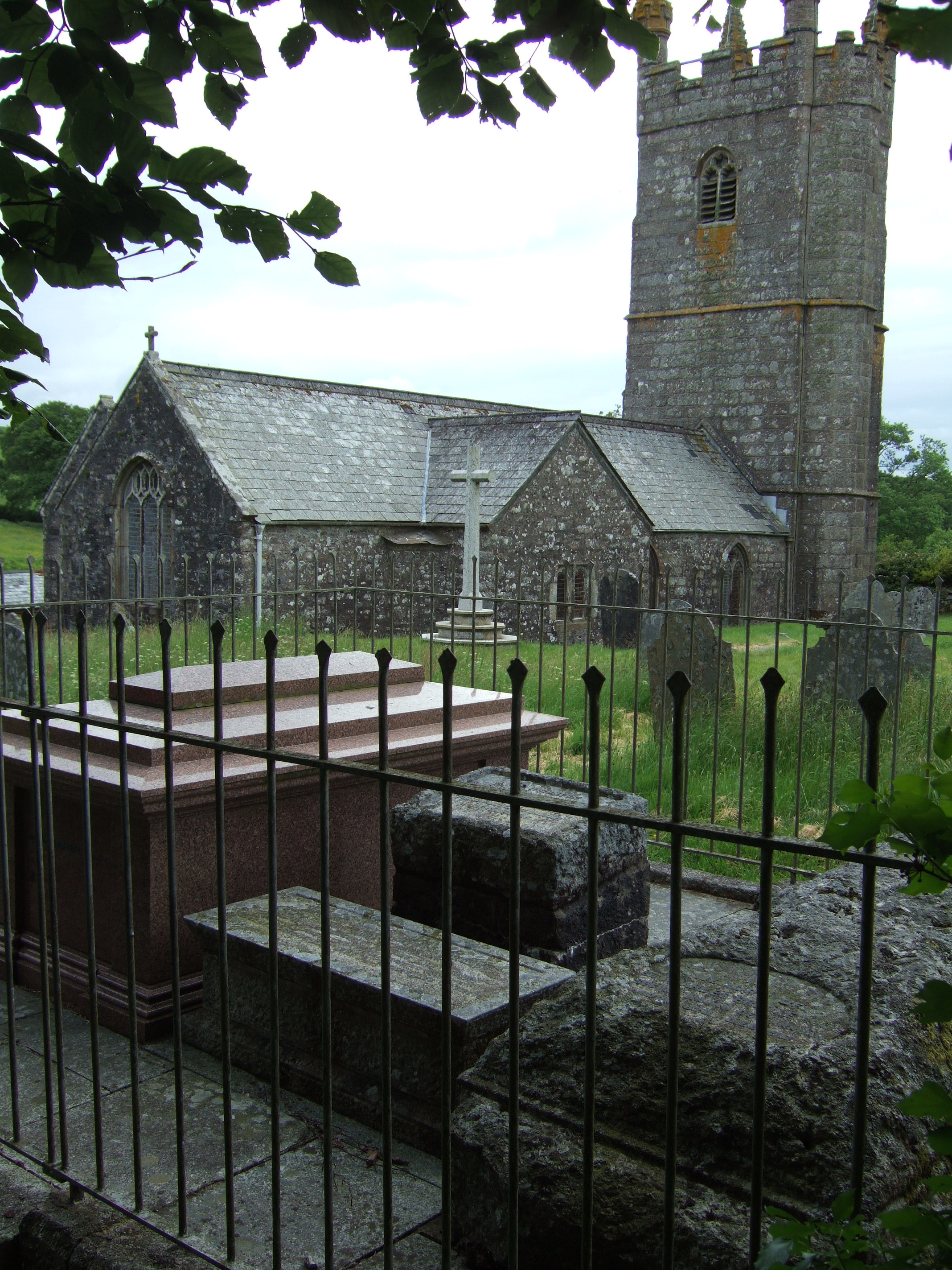
Graves of the White Rajahs at St Leonard's Church, Sheepstor, Devon, England

James and Charles had short grammar school educations, Vyner went to public schools and Cambridge University (but without taking degrees). All of them died in England and are buried at Sheepstor parish church, Devon. Anthony Brooke had his ashes interred at Sheepstor as well as at the Brooke family graveyard in Kuching, as per his last wish.

Vyner Brooke instituted significant political reforms during his tenure. He ended the absolute rule of the rajah in 1941, before the Japanese invasion during World War II, by granting new powers to the Council Negri (the parliament). Bertram co-ruled with his elder brother, taking turns of 6–8 months in charge of the country each year. By 1939 Vyner Brooke's nephew Anthony Brooke had taken the reins of government, and it was with a considerable controversy that Vyner attempted to secretly cede Sarawak to Britain in 1946 in what gave rise to the anti-cession movement of Sarawak. Sarawak today is a state of Malaysia after the Malaysia Agreement of 1963.

== Line of succession ==
In accordance with the will of the first rajah, James Brooke, the line of succession to the "sovereignty of Sarawak and all the rights and privileges whatsoever thereto belonging" was to the heirs male lawfully begotten of the Rajah's nephew Charles Anthony Johnson Brooke. Charles inherited under the will in 1868, and confirmed the succession in his own will of 1913. On his accession in 1918, his son Vyner (later Sir Charles Vyner Brooke, Rajah of Sarawak) swore to uphold the will "as forming the constitution of the state". This unique testamentary trust became known as the Sarawak Sovereignty Trust.

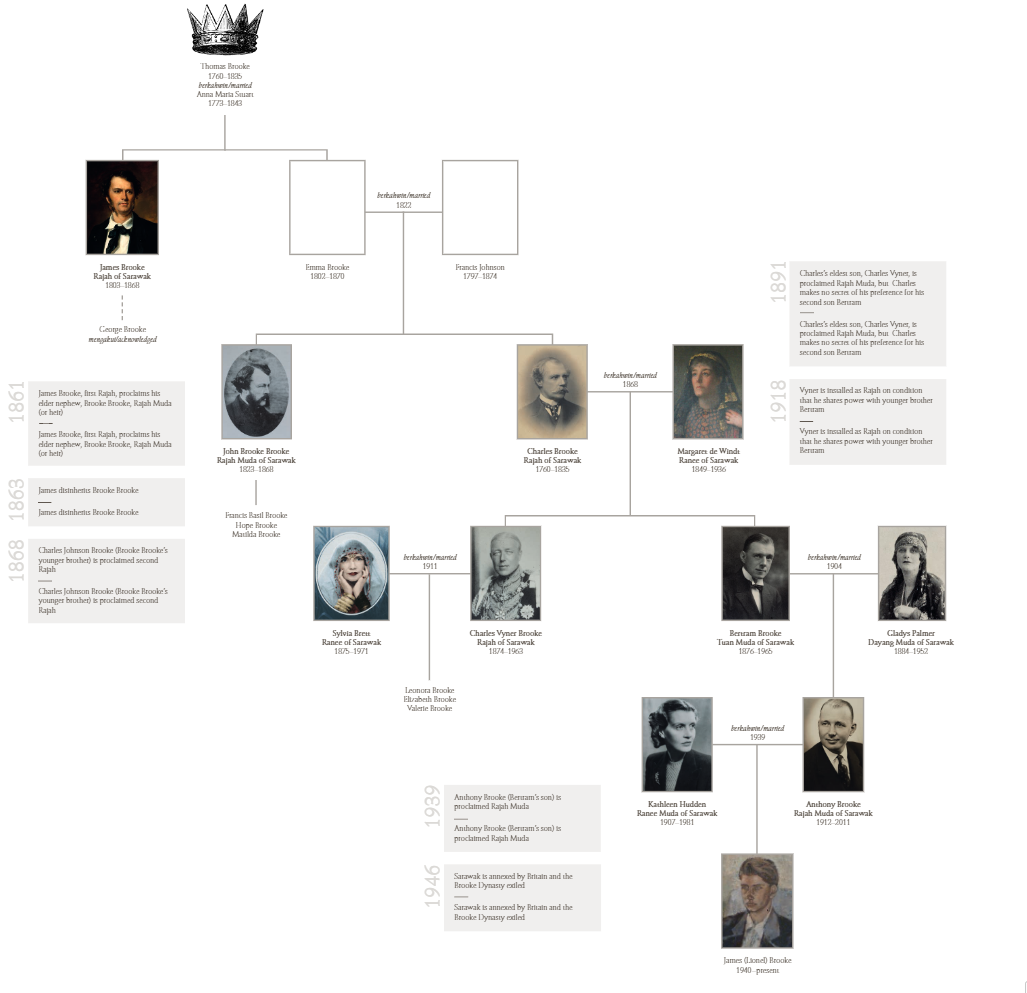
The Brooke dynasty tree

== Government ==
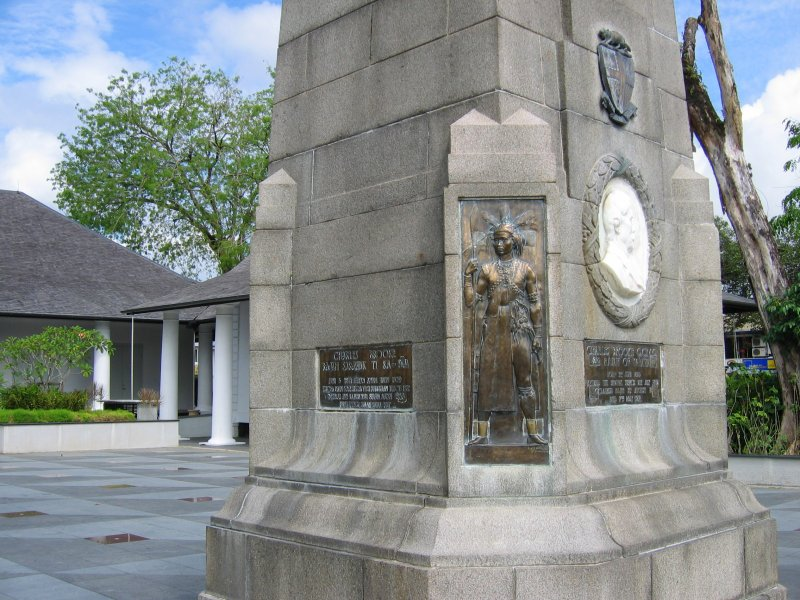
Brooke Memorial outside the Old Courthouse at Kuching showing bronze image of a Sarawak native warrior

When James Brooke first arrived in Sarawak, it was governed as a vassal state of the Sultanate of Brunei; the system of government was based on the Bruneian model. Brooke reorganised the government according to the British model, eventually creating a civil service. It recruited European (chiefly British) officers to run district outstations. The Sarawak Service was continually reformed by Rajah James and his successors.

Rajah James retained many of the customs and symbols of Malay monarchy, and combined them with his own style of absolute rule. The Rajah had the power to introduce laws and acted as chief judge in Kuching.

The White Rajahs were determined to prevent the indigenous peoples of Sarawak from being exploited by Western business interests. They allowed Borneo Company Limited (the Borneo Company) to assist in managing the economy. The core of the early Sarawak economy was antimony, later followed by gold, which was mined in Bau by a Chinese company which imported numerous workers from China and Singapore. After the local Chinese uprising in 1857, the mining operations were gradually taken over by the Borneo Company; it bought out the last Chinese company in 1884. The Borneo Company provided military support to the White Rajahs during crises such as the Chinese uprising. One of the company steamships, the Sir James Brooke, helped recapture Kuching.

Rajah Charles formed a small paramilitary force, the Sarawak Rangers, to police and defend the expanding state. This small army also manned a series of forts around the country, acted as the rajahs' personal guard, and performed ceremonial duties.

== Cession to the United Kingdom ==
After World War II, during which Sarawak and the rest of Borneo had been occupied by Japanese forces, the third rajah, Vyner Brooke, ceded Sarawak to the Colonial Office. Unclear as to the legality of cession, the British government simultaneously passed a Bill of Annexation. Rajah Vyner's nephew and legal heir, Anthony Brooke, initially opposed annexation by the Crown, as did a majority of the native members of the Council Negri.

Because of his opposition to the cession, Anthony Brooke was considered a suspect when Duncan Stewart, the second British governor to Sarawak, was assassinated by two people that were believed to be members of a group dedicated to restoring him as rajah. In reality, they were from a political group agitating for union with newly independent Indonesia. He was never prosecuted. Documents released in the late 20th century indicate that the British government knew that Brooke was not involved, but chose not to reveal the truth of the matter so as not to provoke Indonesia. It had recently won its war of independence from the Netherlands, and the UK was already dealing with the Malayan Emergency to the north-west. Since those events, there has been no serious movement for the restoration of the monarchy, although under the will of Sir James Brooke any member of the Brooke family is eligible to be appointed heir.

The Brooke family still maintains strong ties to the state and its people and are represented by the Brooke Trust, and by Anthony Brooke's grandson Jason Brooke, at many state functions and supporting heritage projects.

== Legacy ==
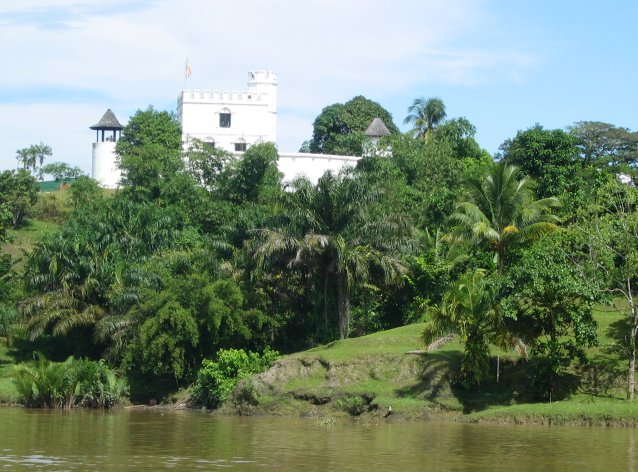
Fort Margherita was erected by Rajah Charles and named after his wife, the Ranee Margaret.

The coaling station of Brooketon in Brunei was named after the Brooke family.

The architectural legacy of the dynasty can be seen in many of the country's 19th-century and colonial heritage buildings. In Kuching these include the Astana, or governor's residence; the Sarawak State Museum; the Old Courthouse; Fort Margherita; the Square Tower; and Brooke Memorial. The Brooke Dockyard, which was founded in the period of Rajah Charles, is still in operation, as is the original Sarawak State Museum. Several key buildings from the Brooke period, such as the offices and warehouses of Borneo Company, have been demolished for more recent developments.

Modern Kuching has many businesses and attractions that refer to the era of the White Rajahs:

- The James Brooke Café and the Royalist, a pub named after James Brooke's schooner, refer to the history of the Brookes.
- The Brooke Gallery which showcases belongings from the Brooke family and artefacts during their time as the White Rajah. The gallery is located in Fort Margherita.

Sarawak has a diverse population with a large proportion of indigenous tribal peoples, such as the Dayaks (Kayan, Kelabit, Kenyah, Melanau (Kayan Lalo), Kenowit, Sebop Bukitan, Kedayan, Tanjong, Sipeng, Kajang, Sekapan, Kejaman, Lahanan, Punan, Lugat, Lisum, Penan, Sian, Tagal (Murut), Tring, Adang, Livong, Miriek, Tabun, Ukit, Bakong, Kiput, Berawan, Narum, Dali, Penan & other Dayaks), Malay, Bidayuh (Land Dayaks) and Iban (Sea Dayaks). In addition, it received numerous Chinese and Indian immigrants, whose businesses and labour were encouraged at various times by the White Rajahs.

== Heraldry and emblems ==
Government flag of the Raj of Sarawak, ~1870–1946

The heraldic arms of the Brooke dynasty were based on the emblem used by James Brooke prior to 9 November 1848. It consisted of a red and black cross per pale on a yellow shield, crested by a badger, known in heraldic parlance as a "brock" and hence alluding to the dynastic surname. The shield design was used as the basis of the Sarawak flag hoisted 21 September 1848. A crown was added to the flag around 1870 when Charles Brooke wanted to differentiate the government flag from the merchant flag (without crown).

Personal coat of arms of James Brooke

On 9 November 1848 Sir James Brooke, KCB was granted a coat of arms (Or a Cross engrailed per cross indented, Azure and Sable in the first quarter an Estoile of the second. Crest: On an Eastern Crown Or a Brock Proper ducally gorged also Or). The arms were for him and his descendants and the descendants of his late father Thomas Brooke.

== Family tree ==
Thomas Brooke
Francis Johnson	Emma Brooke	James Brooke; 1st White Rajah
John Brooke Johnson Brooke; Rajah Muda	Charles Anthoni Johnson Brooke; 2nd White Rajah	George Brooke
Esca Brooke-Daykin	Charles Vyner Brooke; 3rd White Rajah	Bertram Brooke; Tuan Muda
Anthony Brooke; Rajah Muda
James Lionel Brooke
Laurence Brooke	Jason Brooke

== See also ==
- Raj of Sarawak
- List of Sarawakian royal consorts
- List of heads of government of the Raj of Sarawak
- Maluka, a small independent state established by Alexander Hare in southern Borneo, 30 years before James Brooke
