= Brooke Memorial =

Monument in Kuching, Sarawak, Malaysia

Coordinates: 1°33′36″N 110°20′43″E

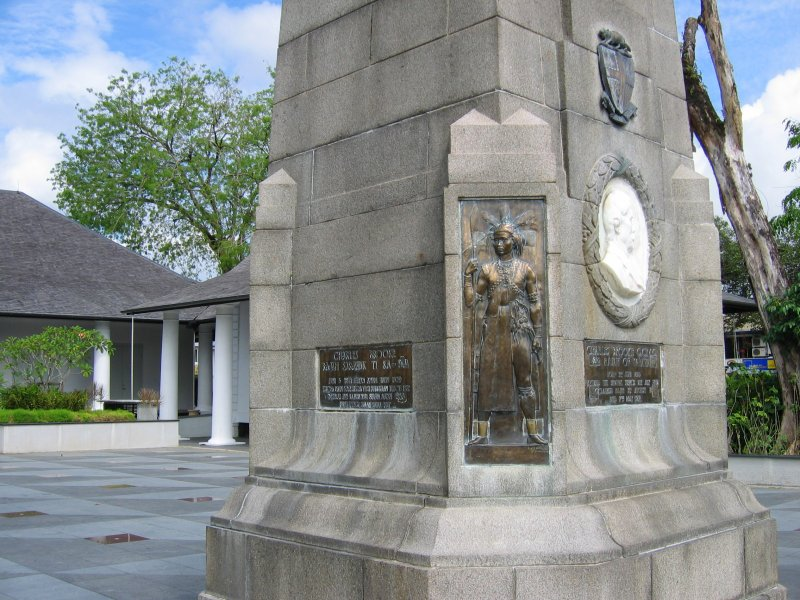
- Location: Jalan Gambier, Kuching, Sarawak, Malaysia
- Designer: Denis Santry of Swan & Maclaren, Singapore
- Type: Obelisk
- Material: Granite
- Width: 18 feet base diameter
- Height: 24 feet
- Beginning date: 1923
- Inauguration date: 13 October 1924
- Dedicated to: Charles Brooke, the second Rajah of Sarawak

The Brooke Memorial, situated in front of the old court house in Kuching, Sarawak, Malaysia, was commissioned in memory of Charles Brooke, the second Rajah of Sarawak, who ruled Sarawak from 1868 to 1917.

== History ==
In 1917, on the death of Charles Brooke, the second Rajah of Sarawak, a memorial fund was established to invite public subscriptions for a suitable memorial, approved by Charles Vyner Brooke, the third Rajah of Sarawak, acting as patron, at a meeting on 15 September 1917. Several suggestions were discussed including the establishment of various charitable institutions, and a personal memorial to Brooke.

In August 1922, the committee of the memorial fund reported that $68,617 had been raised, and it was decided, in addition to building a leper settlement, to allocate $20,000 for the erection of a personal memorial. The commission to create the memorial was given to Denis Santry of Swan & Maclaren, Singapore, after approval of his proposed design with some minor alterations. The memorial was unveiled by the third Rajah of Sarawak on 13 October 1924.

== Description ==
The obelisk is in granite and has a height of about 24 feet with a base measuring 18 feet in diameter. On each of the four supporting pilasters are placed bronze tablets, by F. J. Wilkinson, showing the four predominant races of Sarawak, the Dyak, the Malay, the Chinese and the Kayan, between which are bronze tablets with descriptive inscriptions in different languages. On the front is a profile of Brooke in marble, a replica of the bust of Brooke by Baroness von Gleichen, and armorial bearings of the Brooke family.
