= Sarawak State Museum =

- Muzium Negeri Sarawak
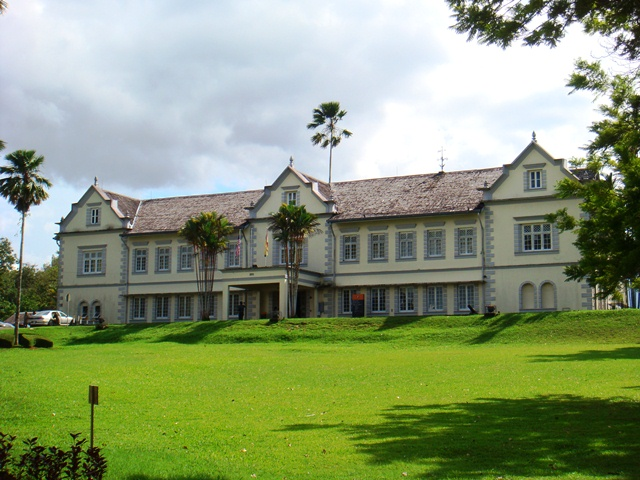
- Established: Built in 1889. Open on 4 August 1891
- Location: Kuching, Sarawak, Malaysia
- Coordinates: 1°33′17″N 110°20′37″E
- Type: Ethnology museum
- Founder: Charles Brooke
- Owner: Sarawak state government
- Website: museum.sarawak.gov.my

The Sarawak State Museum (Malay: Muzium Negeri Sarawak) is the oldest museum in Borneo. It was founded in 1888 and opened in 1891 in a purpose-built building in Kuching, Sarawak.

== History ==
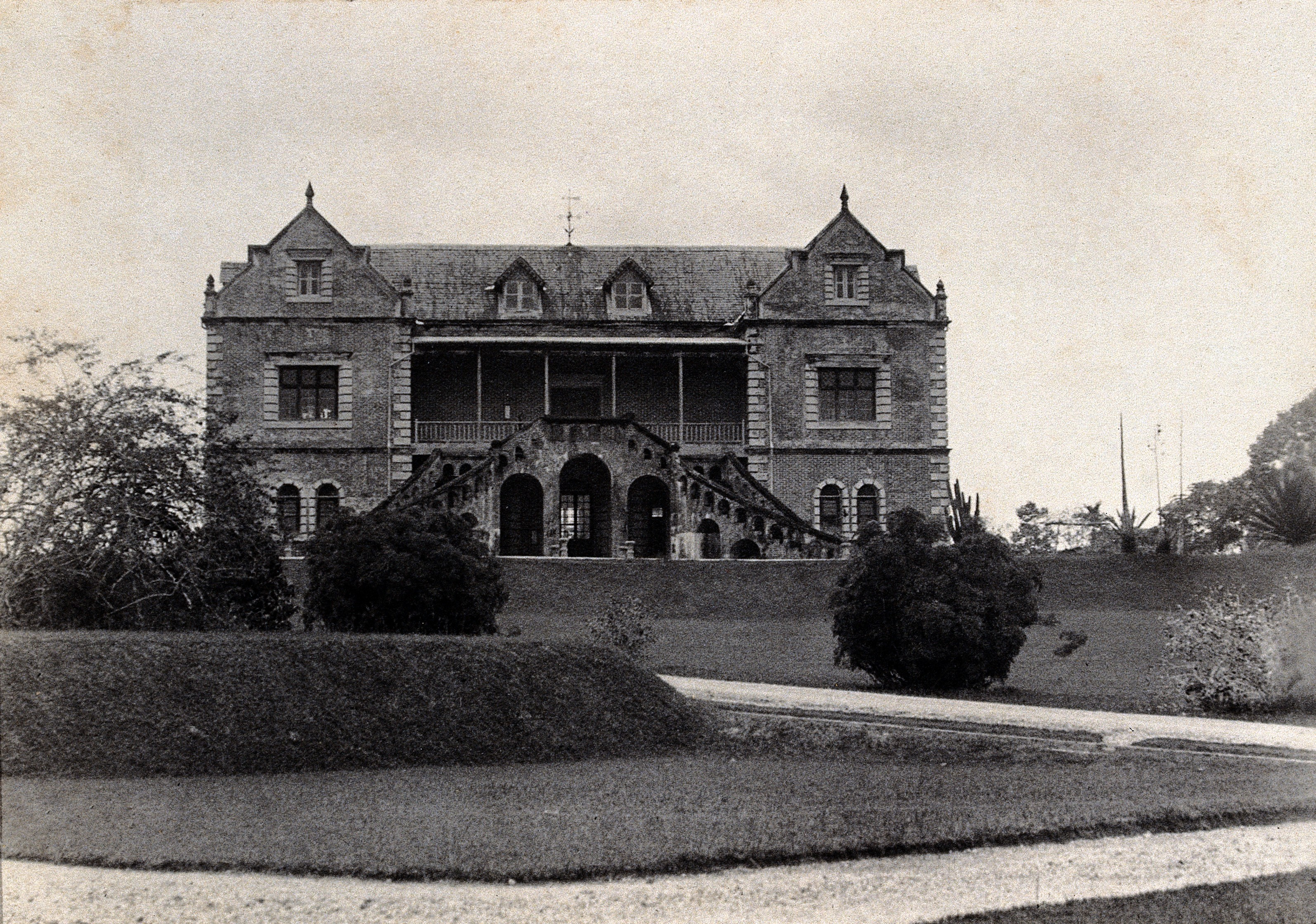
The museum in 1896, prior to its extension in 1911

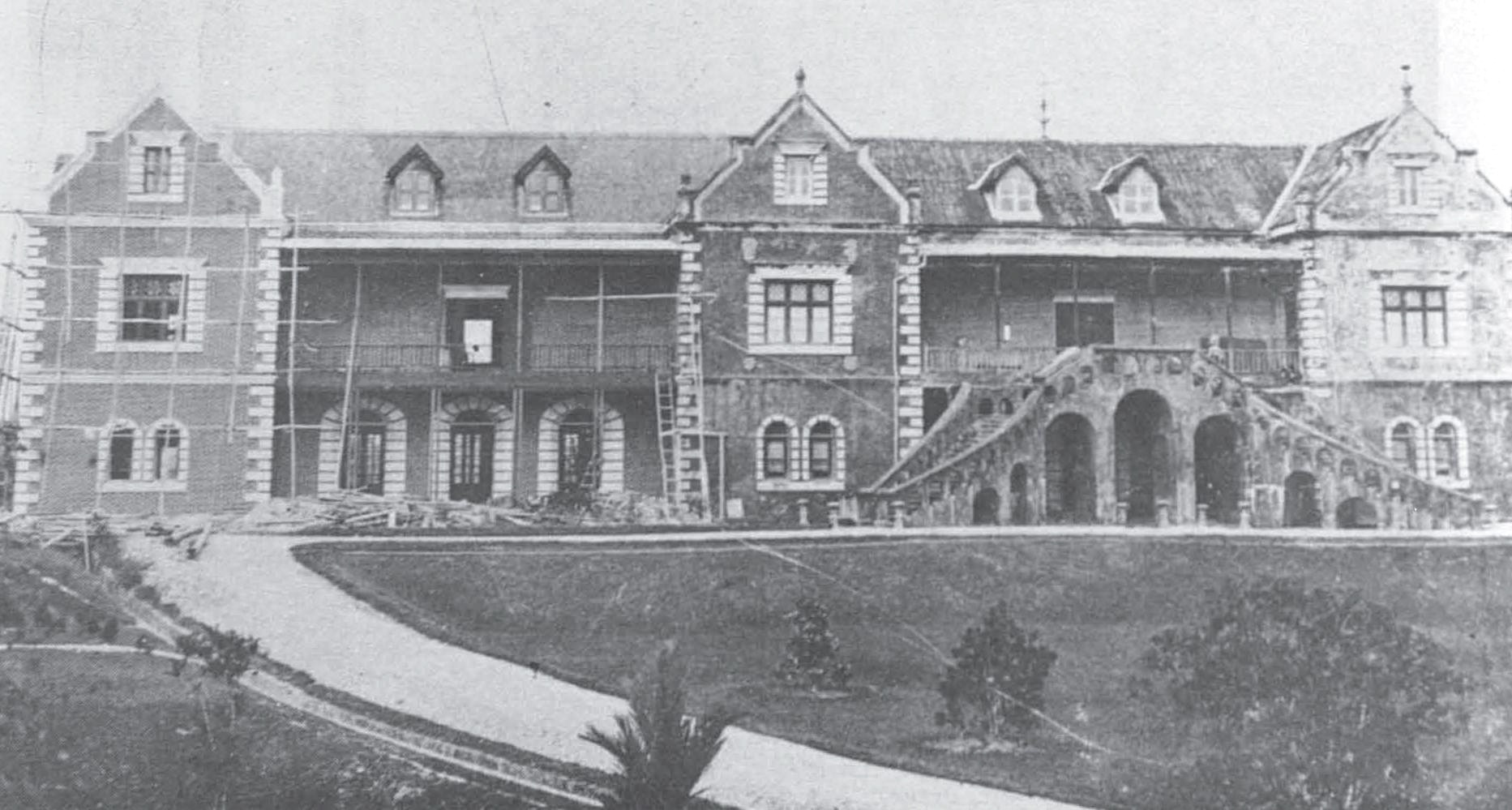
The museum after its extension in 1911

It has been said that naturalist Alfred Russel Wallace encouraged Charles Brooke, the second White Rajah of Sarawak, to establish the museum (there is no evidence for this as Wallace, although he did return to England with Charles (Johnson) in 1862, supported his elder brother, Brooke, when he was disinherited in 1863, and retained no known links). Indeed, naturalists Beccari, Doria, and Hornaday are more likely to have encouraged the Rajah, in 1878, to ask his officers to collect specimens throughout the state, with a view to building a museum in the future, and he asked for land from the Anglican Mission in 1880. As the collections began to increase, the specimens were put inside a clock tower at a government office.

When Hugh Brooke Low's collections arrived, the specimens were moved to a room above an old vegetable market on Gambir road. Hugh Brooke Low collected about 500 ethnographic specimens from the Rajang and Lupar rivers during his service with the Brooke government from 1869 to 1886. His collection was displayed briefly at South Kensington Museum, London before the Rajah of Sarawak purchased it for $1000. The room served as a temporary museum and was open to the public in November 1886.

Finally, the proper Sarawak museum was built in 1889 and opened on 4 August 1891. The museum extended a new wing in 1911. However, the brick work steps outside the old wing was demolished in 1912. The building was built to permanently house and display local indigenous arts and crafts, and collections of local animals.

During the Japanese Occupation, the museum was directed by a Japanese officer, who was sympathetic to its goals. He protected it and the museum suffered very little damage or looting.

The historic building has been renovated. It is used to exhibit and interpret collections on the natural history of Sarawak. Shell Oil sponsored an exhibit on the petroleum industry, which has been important to Borneo. In addition, it displays archaeological artifacts and reconstructions of examples of the traditional life of the indigenous peoples, and of their arts and crafts. It has the most comprehensive archaeological, natural history, and ethnographic collections on Borneo.

Starting 23 October 2017, the state museum was temporarily closed for refurbishment works. A total of RM28 million was spent on renovating the historic museum building with another RM 280 million spent on constructing a new museum campus building nearby. The new museum building named as the Borneo Cultures Museum was opened in March 2022. It is the largest museum complex in Malaysia, and second largest in Southeast Asia, after Singapore National Museum. However, the reopening of the Sarawak State Museum has since been delayed due to the complexity of fitting out galleries and exhibitions.

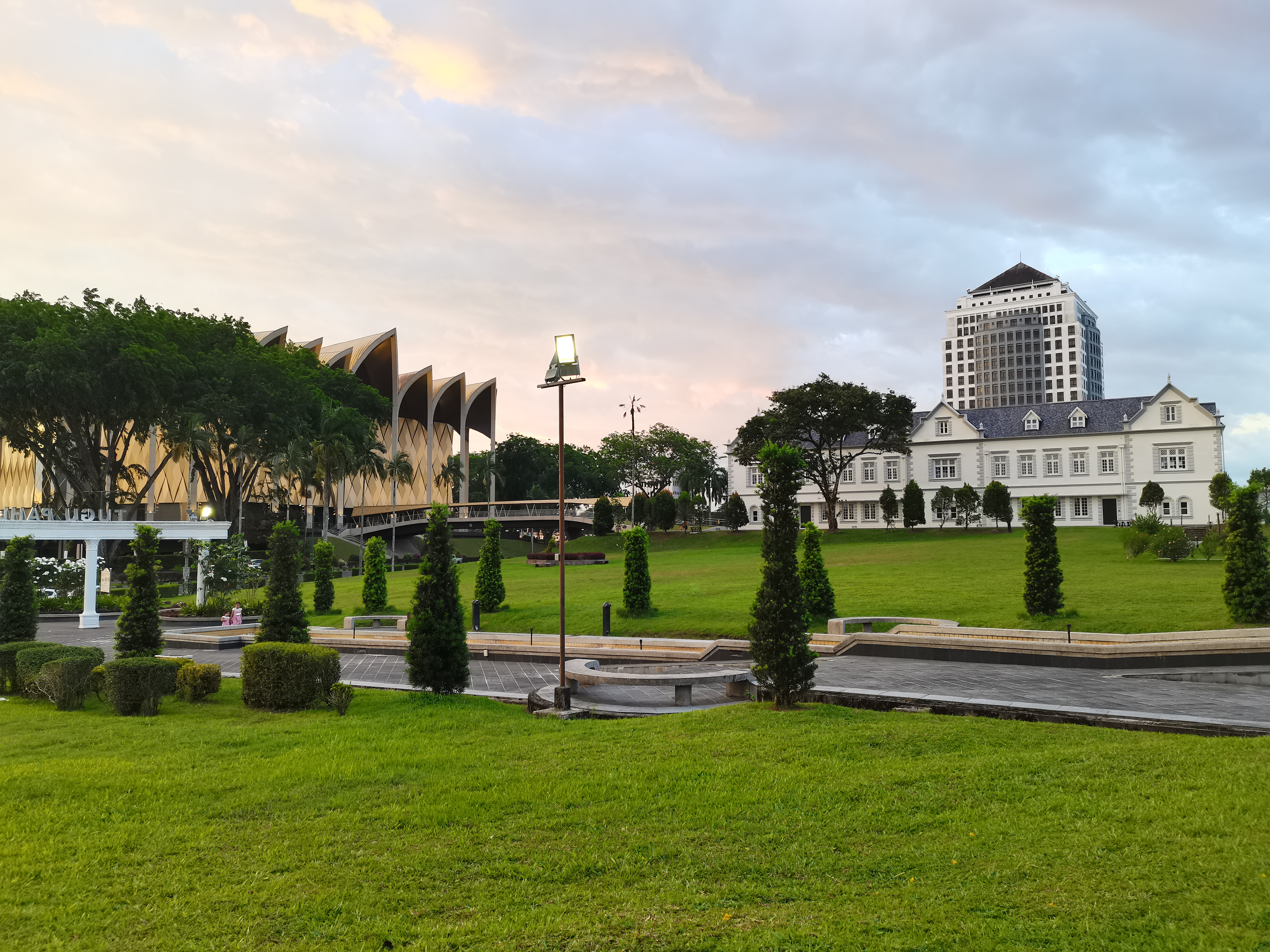
Bridge connecting Sarawak State Museum with Borneo Cultures Museum

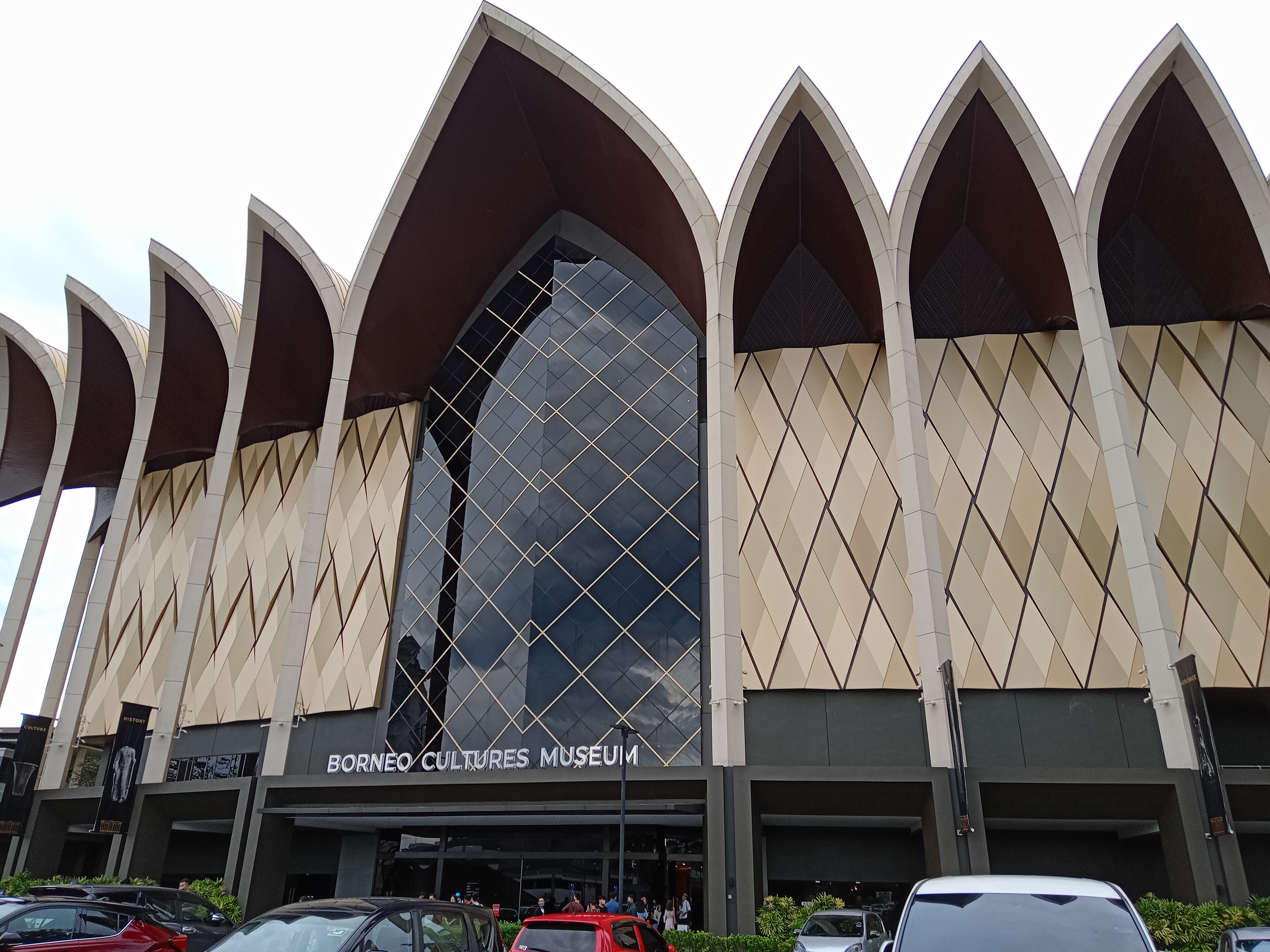
Front of Borneo Cultures Museum building, 2022

== Architecture ==
The building has undergone several renovations and alterations since its construction. It is rectangular, 44' × 160' with walls and pillars of bricks. The museum building has European-style architecture with its edifice in Queen Anne style. It bears a strong resemblance to the Samuel Way Building of the Adelaide Women's and Children's Hospital. The galleries are lit by dormer windows on the roof, making wall space available for exhibit displays and collections.

== Layout ==
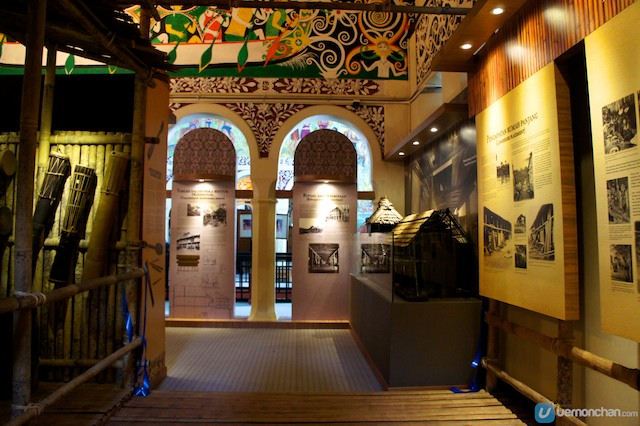
The longhouse gallery inside the museum

The ground floor of the museum holds the natural history collection and specimens of Sarawak fauna – reptiles, mammals, birds, etc., all expertly prepared and mounted for display. The west wing of the museum houses the Shell exhibition on the petroleum industries of Sarawak.

The first floor has exhibits of ethnographic artifacts of the indigenous peoples, such as models of the various types of longhouses, musical instruments, various kinds of fish and animal traps, handicrafts, models of boats and others.

== Activities ==
The museum has been proclaimed guardian of the national patrimony, with the responsibility to search for, acquire and protect antiquities and historical monuments. The museum director is also responsible for protecting marine turtles and assisting the chief game warden in the conservation of wildlife.

== Museum journal ==
The Sarawak Museum Journal is published by the museum staff. It was first published in 1911, with John Moulton the inaugural editor, making it one of the oldest scientific journals of the South-East Asian region. Topics covered include the history, natural history and ethnology of the island of Borneo.

== Curators and directors ==
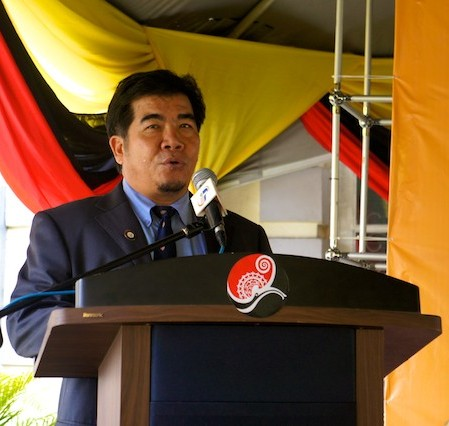
Ipoi Datan, the former director of Sarawak State Museum

Until 1974, the head of the museum was termed as a "Curator". Here are some of the following people who become Curators:

- John Edgar Anderson Lewis — Pro tem Curator, acting from 25 June 1888 – 1902
- Dr. George Darby Haviland — 26 February 1891 – 1 March 1893
- Edward Bartlett — 1 March 1893 – 22 July 1897
- Robert Walter Campbell Shelford — 22 July 1897 – 2 February 1905
- John Hewitt — 2 February 1905 – November 1908
- John Coney Moulton — November 1908 – 22 January 1915
- Mr. Erman & K. H. Gillan — Officers in charge, 22 January 1915 – May 1922 (during WWI)
- Dr. Eric Georg Mjöberg — May 1922 – 19 December 1924
- Gerard MacBryan — Acting Curator, 20 December 1924 – 24 January 1925
- Edward Banks — 20 February 1925 – 1945 (1942–1945 interned)
- Tom Harrisson — June 1947 – November 1966
- Benedict Sandin — December 1966 – March 1974

After this, "Director" was the designated title for the head of the museum. Here are some of the following people who become Directors:

- Lucas Chin — 1 April 1974 – December 1991
- Dr. Peter M. Kedit — December 1991 – April 1996
- Sanib Said — May 1997 – December 2008
- Ipoi Datan — January 2009 – February 2019
- Suria Bin Bujang — February 2019 – 2020 (acting)
- Tazudin Mohtar — 2020 – November 2022
- Nancy Jolhi — February 2023 – present

== See also ==
- List of museums in Malaysia

== Literature ==
- Lenzi, Iola (2004). Museums of Southeast Asia. Singapore: Archipelago Press. p. 200 pages. ISBN 981-4068-96-9.
