= Green Road National Secondary School =

- Sekolah Menengah Kebangsaan Green Road

Location
- Lebuh Sockalingam, Green Road; Kuching, Sarawak, 93150; Malaysia; 1.5445°N 110.3347°E

Information
- Type: Public secondary (Form 1-6)
- Motto: May We Grow As One
- Established: 1964; 62 years ago
- Session: Double
- School code: YEB1201
- Principal: En. Faidzul bin Ahmad
- Colours: Green and Yellow

Green Road National Secondary School (Malay: Sekolah Menengah Kebangsaan Green Road), previously known as Green Road Secondary School (GRSS), is a public English medium secondary school in Kuching, the capital of the East Malaysian state of Sarawak.

== History ==
In 1903, Charles Anthoni Johnson Brooke, the second White Rajah of Sarawak, founded a boys' school, called the 'Government Lay School', where Malays could be taught in the Malay language. Later, the name of the school was changed to 'James Brooke Malay School'. That school was moved to a new site in P. Ramlee Road, in 1930, and renamed 'Madrasah Melayu Sarawak'.

Due to the increasing number of students, Green Road Government Secondary School (the term 'government' was commonly left out in the name, hence the acronym GRSS) was built at Green Road. GRSS started in 1963 with its students consisting mainly of those from 'Madrasah Melayu'. GRSS was officially opened on 10 June 1965 by Abdul Aziz, the then Chief Secretary of The Ministry of Education, with 335 students and 25 teachers. With the passage of English as the medium of instruction (late 1970s), GRSS became known as Sekolah Menengah Kerajaan (SMK) Green Road. Later still, it became Sekolah Menengah Kebangsaan (SMK) Green Road.
