= Royalist (schooner) =

19th century British ship

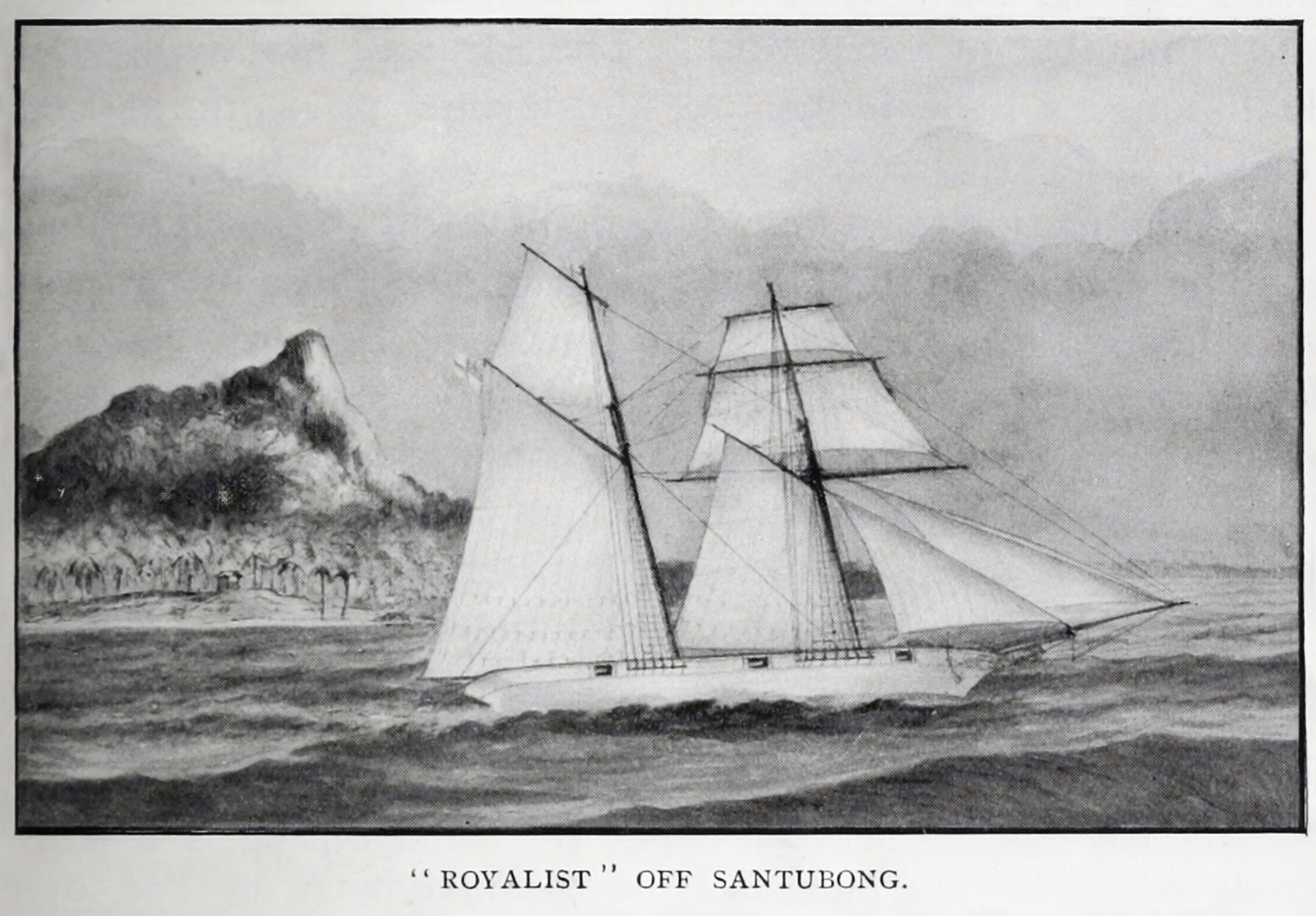

History

United Kingdom
- Name: Royalist
- Owner: James Brooke
- Builder: Built in Cowes
- Launched: 1834
- Acquired: 1836
- Fate: Wrecked, 11 December 1854

General characteristics
- Class & type: Topsail schooner
- Tons burthen: 142 (bm)
- Armament: 6 × 6-pounder guns

The Royalist was a 142-ton topsail schooner. She was probably built in Cowes in 1834 as a gentleman's yacht for Rev T. L. Lane. James Brooke, at that point a former British soldier who would become in 1841 the first "White Rajah" of Sarawak, purchased her in 1836 with money he had inherited from his father. Brooke intended to use it for an expedition to the East Indies in the course of a circumnavigation of the globe, in preparation for which he cruised in the Mediterranean in 1837. As a vessel of the Royal Yacht Squadron it was permitted to fly the White Ensign and be accorded the same rights as ships of the Royal Navy. When armed, with "6 six-pounders, a number of swivels, and small arms in abundance," Royalist was effectively a private warship.

Royalist played an instrumental role in establishing Brooke's foothold in Sarawak, from his first visit in 1839 until he became the first White Rajah of Sarawak in 1841. Royalist was recorded in Brunei in September 1843, and is said to have been sold early in 1844.

It appears that Royalist retained her name and ended up trading, after some time in the Sandwich Islands trade, in Auckland, New Zealand, before being wrecked at Kawhia on 11 December 1854, when she was carrying a cargo of timber and wheat.

In modern Sarawak, there are several references to this well known ship, such as The Royalist Pub in Kuching.
