= Jason Brooke =

Rajah Muda of Sarawak

- Tuan Muda of Sarawak
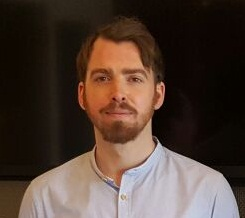
- Brooke in 2016
- Born: Jason Desmond Anthony Brooke; 22 April 1985 (age 41); London, England
- Spouse: Kate Maria Brooke
- Issue: 2
- House: Brooke family
- Father: James Bertram Lionel Brooke
- Mother: Karen Mary Lappin
- Known for: Chairman of The Brooke Trust

Jason Desmond Anthony Brooke FRAS (born 22 April 1985) is the grandson of the last rajah muda of Sarawak, Anthony Walter Dayrell Brooke, and a prominent representative of the Brooke dynasty in Sarawak, modern-day Malaysia.

== Background ==
Born in London, Brooke grew up there, in Edinburgh and the east coast of Ireland, reading English Literature at University College Dublin, and earning an MPhil International Relations from Trinity College, Dublin. A keen rower, Brooke served as Captain of the Boats, University College Dublin Boat Club, for 2007/2008.

In 2011, Brooke sought a formal exoneration for his grandfather from the British Government on behalf of his family, over allegations Anthony Brooke had been complicit in the assassination of Duncan Stewart, the Governor of Sarawak, in 1949. The release of previously missing records clearing Anthony's name led to a BBC Radio 4 documentary aired in March 2011, just weeks after Anthony's death. In 2013, Brooke brought his grandfather's ashes to Sarawak for burial following a large public memorial service. The Acting British High Commissioner to Malaysia attended and offered an apology on behalf of the United Kingdom, clearing Anthony's name of any involvement.

He is President of the Sarawak Association, founded by his great-grandfather Bertram Brooke, Tuan Muda of Sarawak in 1924. He is a member of the Borneo Research Council and has served on the Council of the British Malaysian Society.

== Brooke Trust ==
In 2010, Jason Brooke set up the Brooke Trust, with encouragement from his grandfather Anthony Brooke to preserve the collections of artefacts and papers related to the Brooke family and its century-long dynasty in Sarawak.

Through the Brooke Trust, Jason digitised the Papers of the Brookes of Sarawak in 2012 and made them freely available online.

In 2012, Brooke Trust started a project called the "Brooke Gallery" to be housed in Fort Margherita in Kuching, which was realised on 24 September 2016, the 175th anniversary of the founding of the State of Sarawak.

Jason Brooke has been responsible for signing important memoranda with the Sarawak State Library in Kuching, the Sarawak State Museum, and local communities. In September 2016 he was appointed a technical advisor on a then-upcoming feature film on the life of his ancestor, Sir James Brooke, Rajah of Sarawak. The film, titled Edge of the World, was released in 2021. A letter of agreement was signed by the Trust with Swinburne University of Technology through its Sarawak campus in 2023 to collaborate on historical preservation of kingdom-era documents.
