= John Brooke Johnson Brooke =

John Brooke Brooke
- 1st White Rajah Muda of Sarawak
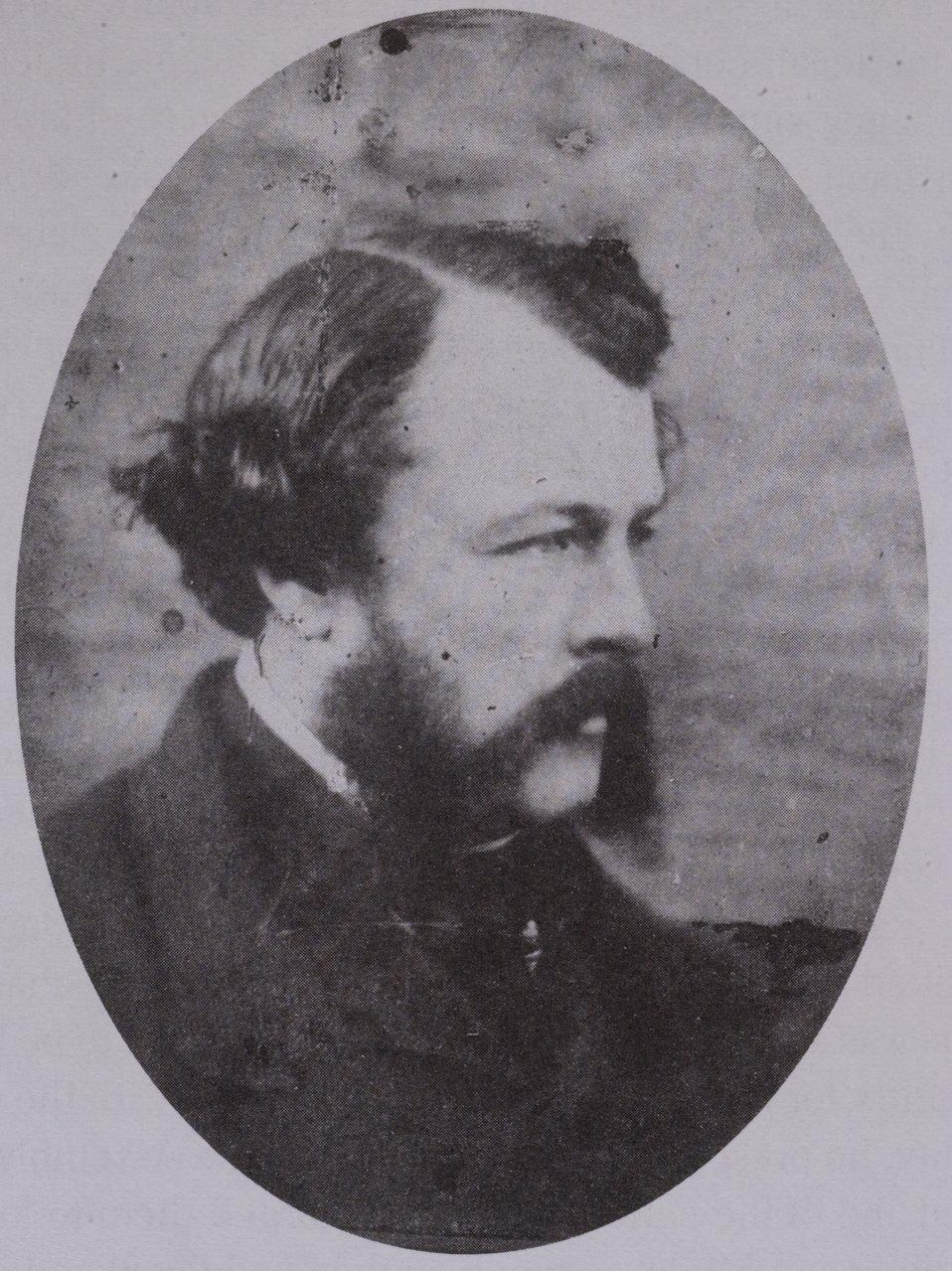
- Heir apparent: Sep 1848
- Born: John Brooke Johnson; 1823; South Stoke, Somerset, England
- Died: 12 May 1868 (aged 44–45); Hounslow Borough, Brentford, Middlesex, England
- Burial: Whitelackington, Somerset, England
- Spouses: Anne Grant (m. 1856; died 1858) Juliana Caroline Welstead (m. 1861; died 1862)
- Issue: with Anne Grant: Francis Basil; John Charles Evelyn Hope; with Juliana Caroline Welstead: Matilda Agnes
Names
- John Brooke Johnson Brooke
- Dynasty: Brooke Dynasty
- Father: Francis Johnson
- Mother: Emma Johnson

Military service
- Allegiance: British Empire
- Branch/service: 88th Foot
- Rank: Captain

John Brooke Johnson Brooke (born John Brooke Johnson, 1823 – 1 December 1868) was a soldier and Rajah Muda (heir apparent) of the Raj of Sarawak until disinherited in favour of his younger brother, Charles.

He was born in South Stoke near Bath, to Francis Charles Johnson, a clergyman and Emma Frances Brooke, an elder sister of James Brooke. James took John on a long cruise around the Mediterranean in 1837 in his yacht, Royalist. John then joined the British Army’s 88th Foot as an ensign in 1839, and became a lieutenant in 1842, and captain in 1848.

Captain Brooke, his preferred name by then, left the 88th Foot in 1848, but did not resign his commission. He was re-assigned to serve as aide-de-camp to James Brooke, now the Governor of Labuan. Captain Brooke adopted the surname of Brooke on 23 May 1848 by Royal concession, and went to join his uncle in Sarawak as Rajah Muda, taking effective charge of the country when James returned to England. He spent some time in Labuan at first as James was establishing himself as its first governor, but was subsequently based in Kuching. He has been largely ignored in the standard historical accounts of Sarawak, but substantial records survive which show how active he was, and his engagement with pirates in the Battle off Mukah in 1862 has attracted interest.

Brooke married Anne Grant, a granddaughter of Lord Elgin, at Kilgrastron in Scotland in 1856. They went to live in Kuching where they had two sons, Basil (1857–1860), and John Charles Evelyn Hope (1858–1934), but Anne died shortly after Hope's birth. Brooke's second marriage was to Juliana Caroline Welstead: they had met in England and married in Singapore in 1861; Julia died a year later giving birth to a daughter, Matilda Agnes (1862–1943).

Brooke died in Hounslow in 1868 after a long illness, and was buried in his father's churchyard at his childhood home of Whitelackington.
