= James Brooke =

British ruler in Sarawak from 1841 to 1868

Sir James Brooke KCB
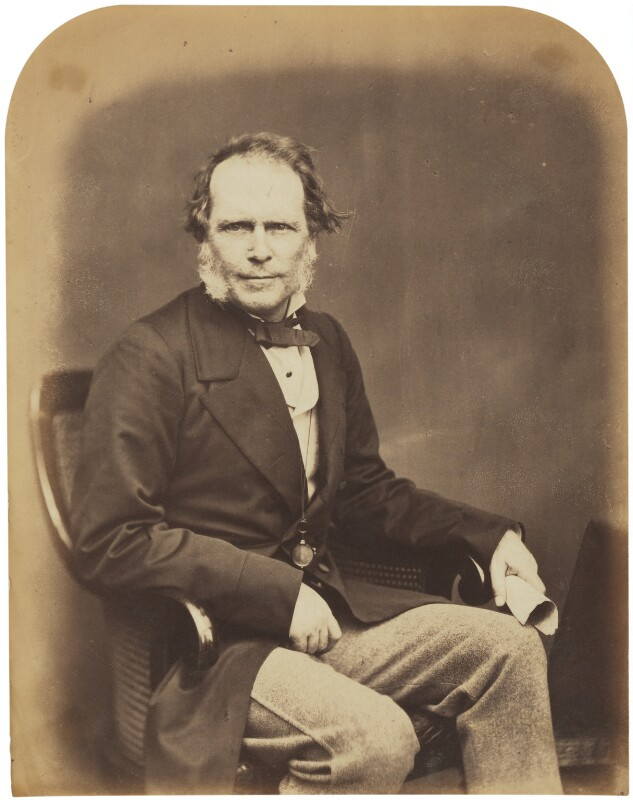
- Portrait by Herbert Watkins, 1858

Rajah of Sarawak
- Reign: 18 August 1842 – 11 June 1868
- Installation: 18 August 1842
- Predecessor: Sultan Tengah (as Sultan of Sarawak); Pengiran Indera Mahkota Mohammad Salleh (as Governor of Sarawak)
- Successor: Charles Brooke
- Born: 29 April 1803; Bandel, Bengal Presidency, India
- Died: 11 June 1868 (aged 65); Burrator, United Kingdom
- Burial: St Leonard's Church, Sheepstor
- Issue: Reuben George Walker (Brooke)
- House: Brooke dynasty
- Father: Thomas Brooke
- Mother: Anna Maria Brooke
- Occupation: Soldier, trader, independent gentleman, mercenary, governor

1st Governor of Labuan
- In office 1848–1853
- Monarch: Queen Victoria
- Lieutenant: William Napier (1848–1850); John Scott (1850–1856)
- Preceded by: Newly created
- Succeeded by: George Warren Edwardes

1st Consul General to the Sultan and Independent Chiefs of Borneo
- In office 1847–1853
- Succeeded by: Spenser St. John

Military service
- Allegiance: British Empire
- Branch/service: Bengal Army; East India Company
- Years of service: 1819–1830
- Rank: Lieutenant
- Unit: 6th Regiment Native Infantry
- Battles/wars: First Anglo-Burmese War (1824–1825); Sarawak Uprising of 1836 (1836–1838; as a mercenary)

Sir James Brooke (29 April 1803 – 11 June 1868), was a British soldier and adventurer who founded the Raj of Sarawak in Borneo. He ruled as the first White Rajah of Sarawak from 1841 until his death in 1868.

Brooke was born and raised in India during the rule of the British East India Company. After a few years of education in England, he served in the Bengal Army, was wounded, and resigned his commission. He then bought a ship and sailed to the Malay Archipelago where, in gratitude for helping to crush a rebellion, he was rewarded by the Sultan of Brunei with the position of governor of Sarawak. He then vigorously suppressed piracy in the region and, in the ensuing turmoil, restored the sultan to his throne, for which Brooke was made the rajah of Sarawak. He ruled until his death.

Brooke was not without detractors. He was criticised in the British Parliament and officially investigated in Singapore for his anti-piracy measures. He was, however, honoured and feted in London for his activities in Southeast Asia. The naturalist Alfred Russel Wallace was one of many visitors whose published work spoke of Brooke's hospitality and achievements.

== Early life ==
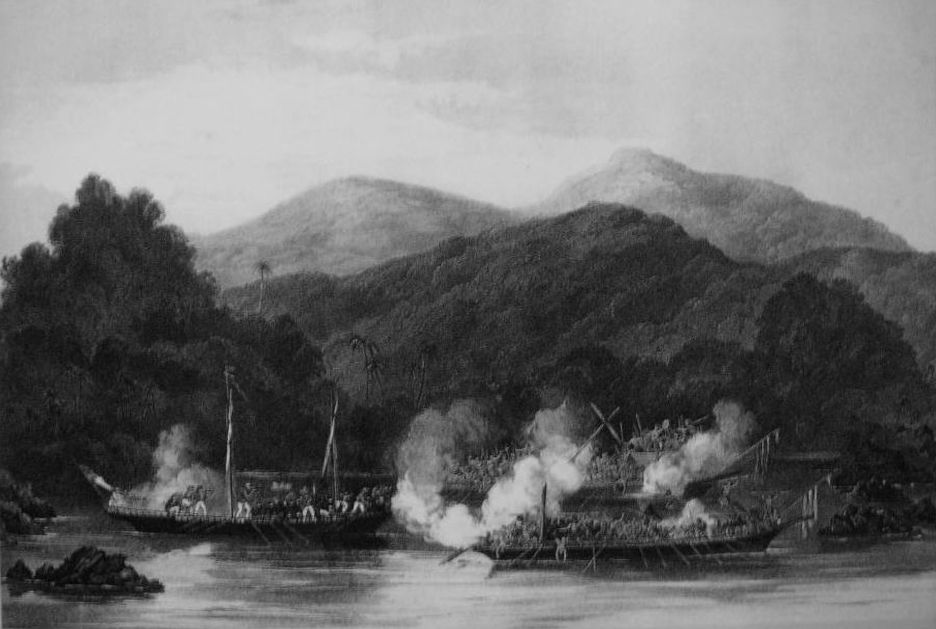
Attack by Illanun pirates on Brooke's Jolly Bachelor, T. Datu, 1843

Brooke was born in Bandel, near Calcutta, Bengal, but baptised in Secrole, a suburb of Benares. His father, Thomas Brooke, was an English judge in the Court of Appeal at Bareilly, British India. His mother, Anna Maria, was born in Hertfordshire and was the daughter of Scottish peer Colonel William Stuart, 9th Lord Blantyre, and his mistress Harriott Teasdale.

Brooke lived in India until he was sent to England at the age of 12 for a brief education at Norwich School from which he ran away. Some home tutoring followed in Bath before he returned to India in 1819 as an ensign in the Bengal Army of the British East India Company. He saw action in Assam during the First Anglo-Burmese War until he was seriously wounded in 1825 and sent to England for recovery. In 1830, he arrived back in Madras but was too late to rejoin his unit, and resigned his commission. He remained on the ship on which he had travelled out, the Castle Huntley, and returned home via China.

== Sarawak ==
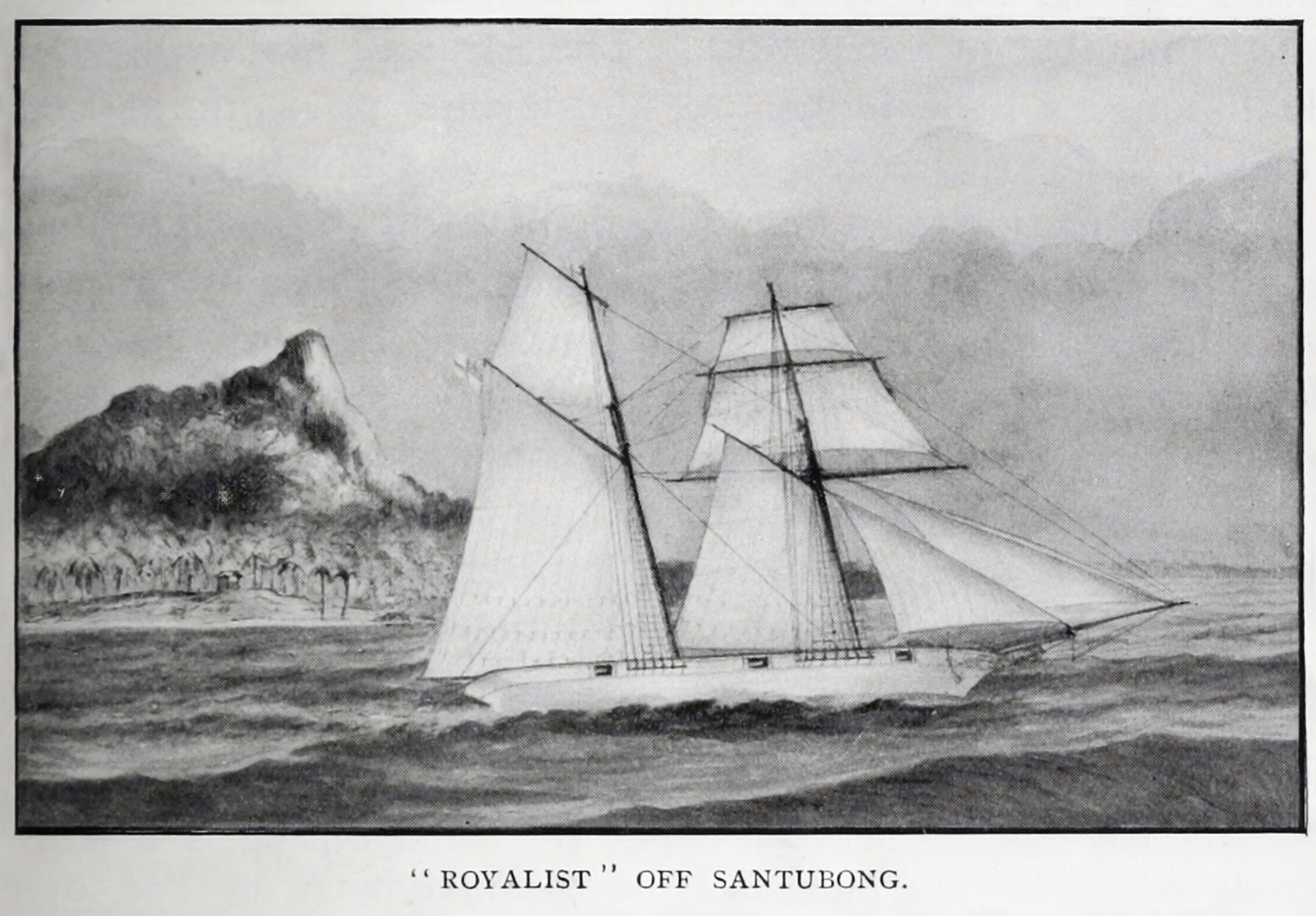
Royalist 1834 – Royal Yacht Squadron – illustrated 1909

Brooke attempted to trade in the Far East, but was not successful. In 1835, he inherited £30,000 (£3M or US$3.7M in 2022 currency), which he used as capital to purchase the Royalist, a 142-ton schooner. Setting sail for Borneo in 1838, he arrived in Kuching in August to find the settlement facing an uprising against the Sultan of Brunei. In Sarawak he met the Sultan's uncle, Pengiran Muda Hashim, to whom he gave assistance in crushing the rebellion, winning the gratitude of Sultan Omar Ali Saifuddin II of Brunei, who, in 1841, offered Brooke the governorship of Sarawak in return for his help.

Brooke was successful in suppressing the widespread piracy in the region. However, some Malay nobles in Brunei, unhappy over Brooke's measures against piracy, arranged for the murder of Muda Hashim and his followers. Brooke, with assistance from a unit of Britain's China Squadron, took over Brunei and restored its sultan to the throne.

In 1842, the Sultan ceded complete sovereignty of Sarawak to Brooke, who was granted the title of Rajah of Sarawak on 24 September 1841, although the official declaration was not made until 18 August 1842. Brooke's cousin, Arthur Chichester Crookshank (1825–1891), joined his service on 1 March 1843 and was appointed as a magistrate.

== Cession of Labuan to Great Britain ==
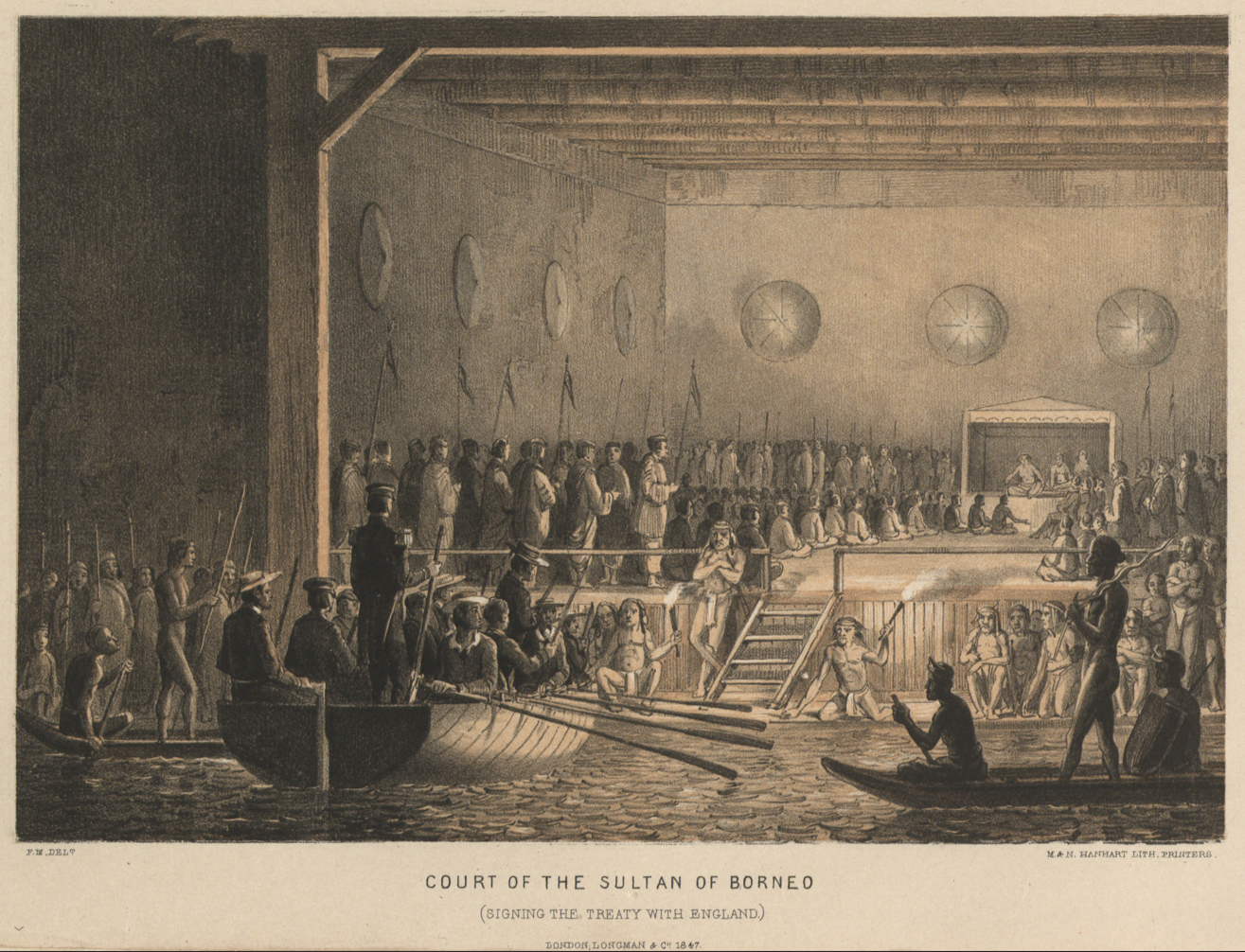
James Brooke and Sir Edward Belcher negotiating with the Sultan of Brunei, Oct 1844 which eventually led to the signing of the Treaty of Labuan between the Brunei sultanate and the British delegation on 18 December 1846 at the court of Brunei, in which Labuan was ceded to Great Britain.

In 1844, Brooke began anti-pirate operations off north-east Sumatra with ships of the Royal Navy and the East India Company. On 12 February, at Murdu, he received a gunshot wound to his right arm and a spear cut to his eyebrow during the second engagement. Later in 1844, the Sultan offered to cede the island of Labuan to the British but terms were not discussed at that time. In November 1846, Captain Rodney Mundy was ordered to obtain the cession of Labuan. He negotiated the cession on 18 December 1846 and took possession of Labuan on 24 December 1846. James Brooke was appointed governor and commander-in-chief of Labuan in 1848.

== Reign ==
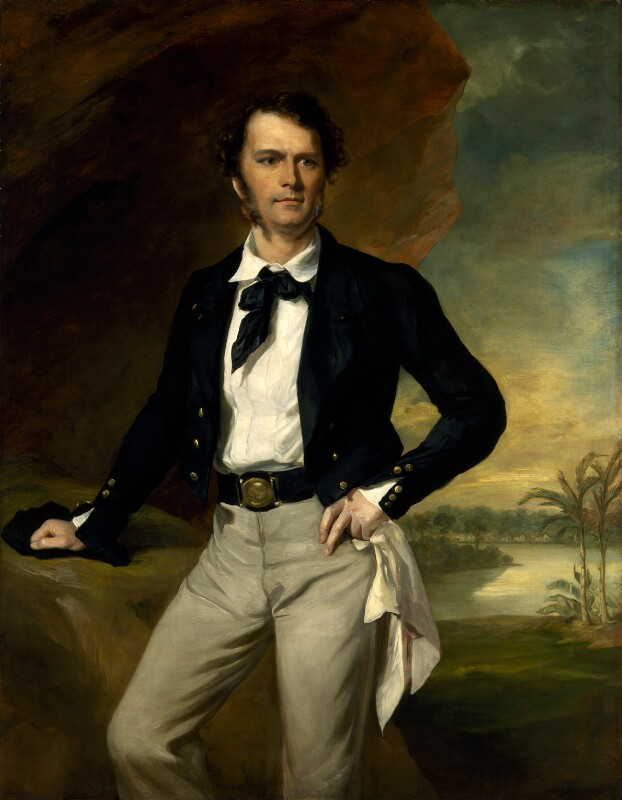
Portrait of Sir James Brooke in 1847 by Francis Grant

During his reign, Brooke began to cement his rule over Sarawak: reforming the administration, codifying laws and fighting piracy, which proved to be an ongoing problem throughout his rule. Brooke returned temporarily to England in 1847, where he was given the Freedom of the City of London, appointed British consul-general in Borneo, and created a Knight Commander of the Order of the Bath (KCB).

Brooke pacified the native peoples, including the Dayaks, and suppressed headhunting and piracy. He had many Dayaks in his forces.

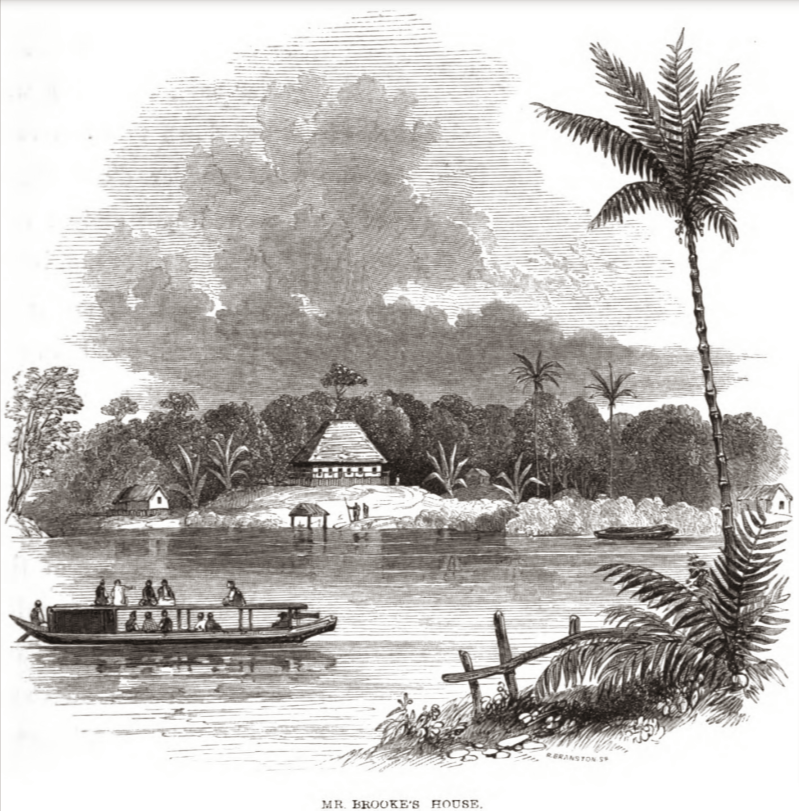
James Brooke's House in Kuching, 1848

In 1851, Brooke was accused of using excessive force against the native people, under the guise of anti-piracy operations, leading to the appointment of a Commission of Inquiry in Singapore in 1854. After an investigation, the commission dismissed the charges.

Brooke wrote to Alfred Russel Wallace on leaving England in April 1853, "to assure Wallace that he would be very glad to see him at Sarawak." That invitation helped Wallace decide on the Malay Archipelago for his next expedition, an expedition that lasted for eight years and established him as one of the foremost Victorian intellectuals and naturalists of the time. When Wallace arrived in Singapore in September 1854, he found Rajah Brooke "reluctantly preparing to give evidence to the special commission set up to investigate his controversial anti-piracy activities."

During his rule, Brooke suppressed an uprising by Liu Shan Bang in 1857, and managed to suppress threats from Sarawak warriors like Sharif Masahor and Rentap.

== Personal life ==
James Brooke was "a great admirer" of the novels of Jane Austen, and would "read them and re-read them", including aloud to his companions in Sarawak.

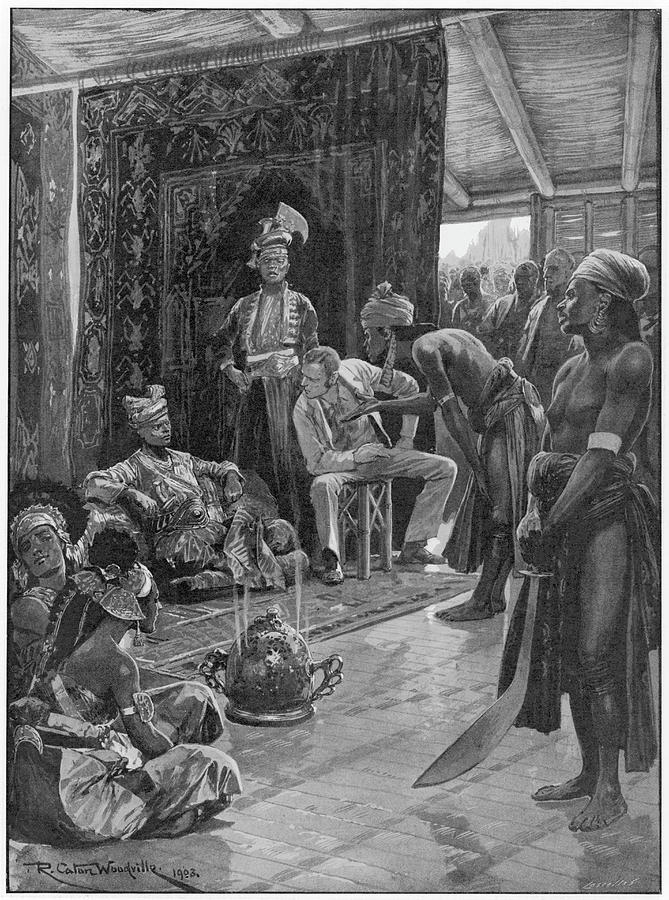
1923 Illustration by R. Caton II Woodville "Sir James Brooke in Borneo 1842"

Brooke was influenced by the success of previous British adventurers and the exploits of the East India Company. His actions in Sarawak were directed at increasing and securing his own personal wealth, expanding the British Empire, and fighting piracy and slavery. His own abilities, and those of his successors, provided Sarawak with modern infrastructure and resulted in both fame and notoriety. His appointment as rajah by the Sultan, and his subsequent knighthood, are evidence both of his shrewd negotiating and political skills, and his willingness to use violent force to suppress his opponents and achieve his goals.

Among his alleged relationships was one with Badruddin, a Sarawakian prince, of whom he wrote, "my love for him was deeper than anyone I knew." This phrase led to some considering him to be either homosexual or bisexual. Later, in 1848, Brooke is alleged to have formed a relationship with 16‑year‑old Charles T.C. Grant, grandson of the seventh Earl of Elgin, who supposedly reciprocated. Whether that relationship was merely a friendship or otherwise is not known. Nigel Barley, one of Brooke's recent biographers, wrote that during Brooke's final years in Burrator in Devon "there is little doubt ... he was carnally involved with the rough trade of Totnes." However, Barley does not note from where he garnered that opinion. Others have suggested Brooke was instead "homo-social" and simply preferred the social company of other men, disagreeing with assertions he was a homosexual.

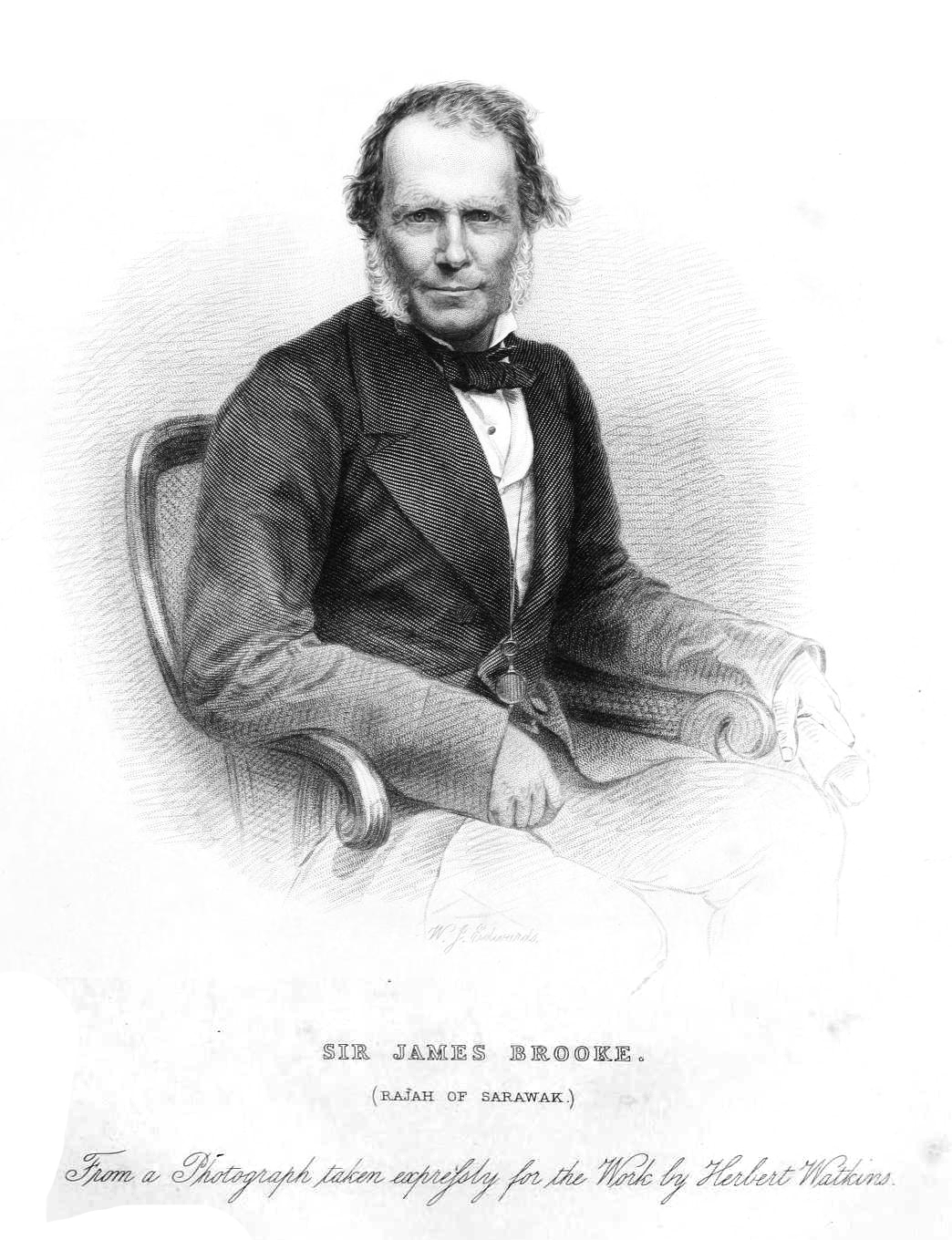
Brooke circa 1860

Although Brooke died unmarried, he did acknowledge a son to his family in 1858. Neither the identity of the son's mother nor his birth date is clear. The son was brought up as Reuben George Walker in the Brighton household of Frances Walker (1841 and 1851 census, apparently born c. 1836). By 1858, he was aware of his connection to Brooke and, by 1871, he was recorded by the census as "George Brooke", age 40, in the parish of Plumtree, Nottinghamshire, birthplace "Sarawak, Borneo".

Reuben married Martha Elizabeth Mowbray on 10 July 1862, and had seven children, three of whom survived infancy. The oldest was named James. George died travelling to Australia, in the wrecking of the SS British Admiral on 23 May 1874. A memorial to this effect – giving a birthdate of 1834 – is in the churchyard at Plumtree.

In a letter to the Foreign Office on 19 July 1915, Francis William Douglas (1874–1953), the Acting Resident for Brunei and Labuan from November 1913 to January 1915, stated that he heard from Pengiran Anak Hashima that Brooke had been married to her aunt Pengiran Fatima, the daughter of Pengiran Anak Abdul Kadir and also the granddaughter of Muhammad Kanzul Alam, the 21st Sultan of Brunei. Douglas went on to say that he had met Dr Ogilvie who told him that he had met a daughter of Rajah Brooke in 1866. She was married but "evidently had foreign blood in her."

== Succession, death and burial ==
Having no legitimate children, in 1861 he formally named his nephew, Captain John Brooke Johnson Brooke, as his successor. Two years later, the Rajah reacted to criticism by returning to the East. After a brief meeting in Singapore, John was deposed and banished from Sarawak. James Brooke increased the charges against John to treasonous conduct and later named John's younger brother, Charles Anthoni Johnson Brooke, as his successor.

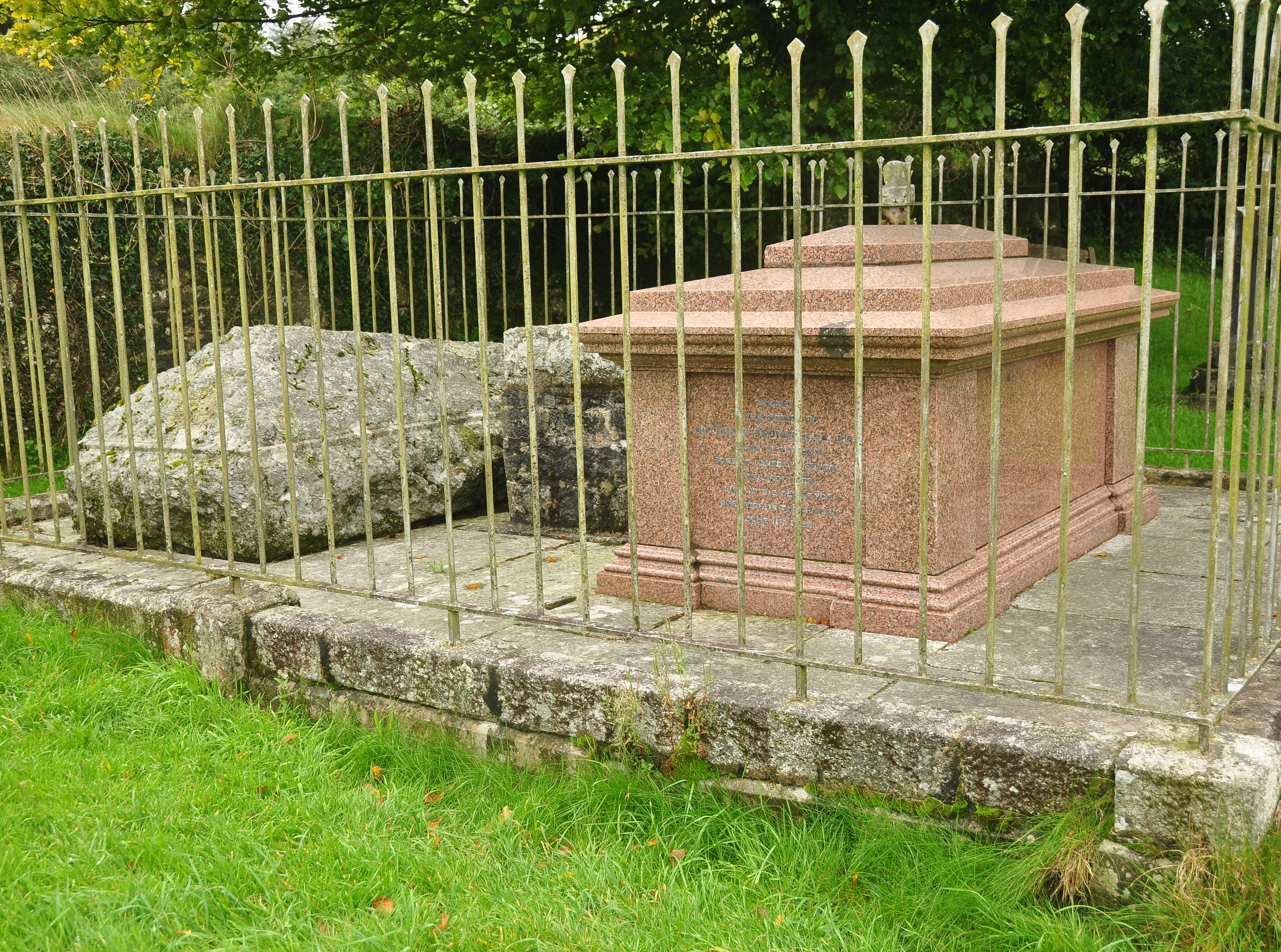
The red granite chest tomb to James Brooke in Sheepstor churchyard

On 11 June 1868, Brooke died in Burrator, Dartmoor, Devon, in south-west England, having suffered three strokes during his last ten years, and was buried at the graveyard of St Leonard's Church in Sheepstor.

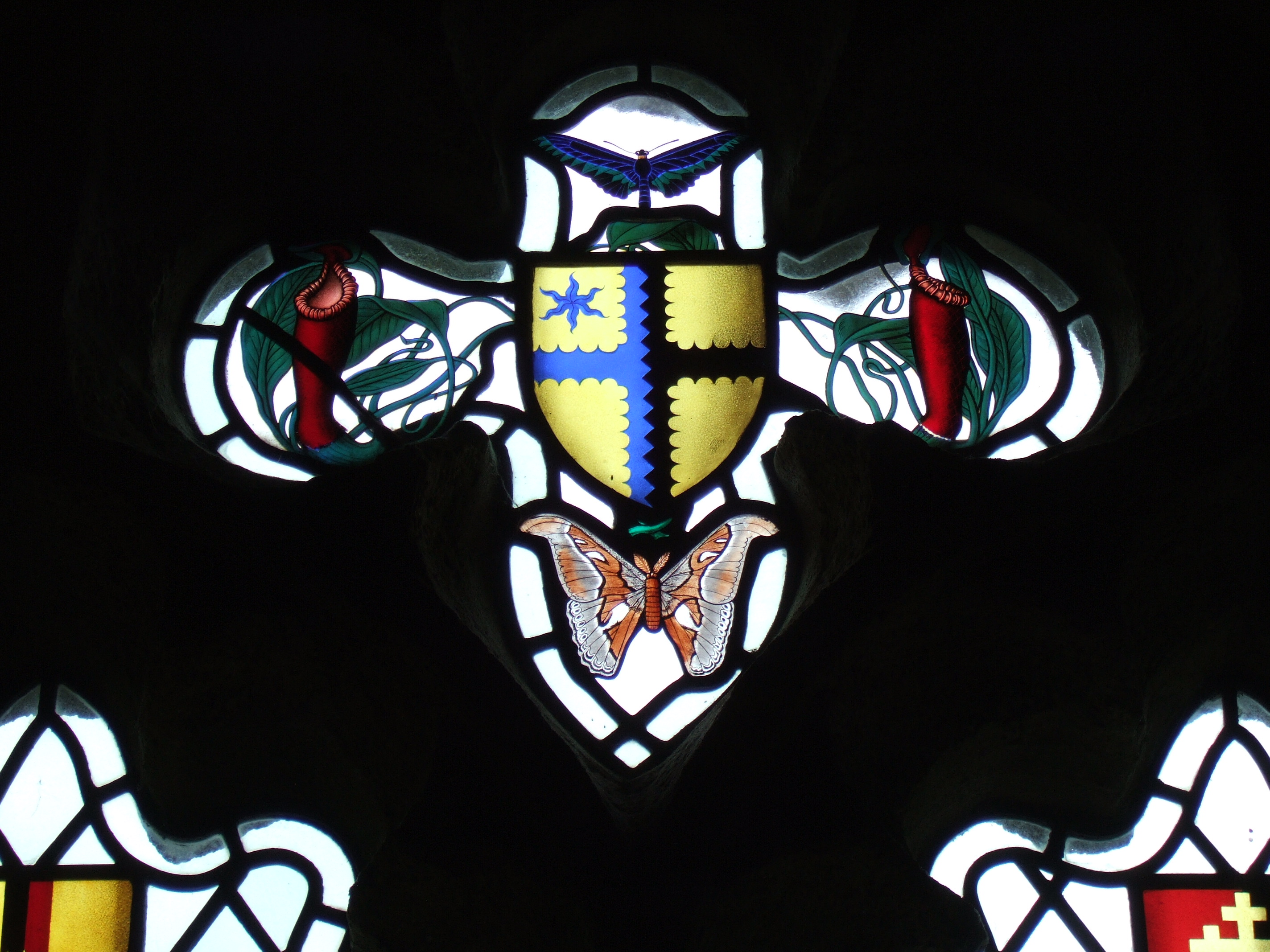
A memorial stained glass window in St Leonard's Church, Sheepstor, dedicated to those from Sarawak who died in World War II. It depicts a butterfly, a moth, and pitcher plants, two of which were named after James Brooke

== In popular culture ==
Fictionalised accounts of Brooke's exploits in Sarawak include Kalimantaan by C.S. Godshalk and The White Rajah by Nicholas Monsarrat. Another book, also called The White Rajah, by Tom Williams, was published by JMS Books in 2010. Brooke is also featured in Flashman's Lady, the sixth book in George MacDonald Fraser's meticulously researched The Flashman Papers novels.

James Brooke was the main antagonist in the second and third novels of Emilio Salgari's Sandokan series. He was played by Adolfo Celi in the 1976 television adaptation and by Ed Westwick in the 2025 series.

Brooke was also a model for the hero of Joseph Conrad's novel Lord Jim, and is briefly mentioned in Rudyard Kipling's short story "The Man Who Would Be King".

Charles Kingsley dedicated the novel Westward Ho! (1855) to Brooke.

In 1936, Errol Flynn intended to star in a film for Warner Bros. of Brooke's life, titled The White Rajah, based on a script by Flynn himself. However, although the project was announced for filming, it was never made.

In September 2016, a film based on Brooke's life was to be made in Sarawak with the support of Abang Abdul Rahman Johari of the Government of Sarawak, with writer Rob Allyn and Sergei Bodrov as its director. The Brooke Heritage Trust, a non-profit organisation, was to serve as the film's technical advisors, with one of them being Jason Brooke, the current heir of the Brooke family. The film, titled Edge of the World, directed by Michael Haussman, was released in 2021.

== Honours and Arms ==
=== British Honours ===
- KCB: Knight Commander of the Order of the Bath, 1848

=== Arms ===
Coat of arms of James Brooke
Adopted 9 November 1848 Crest On an Eastern Crown Or a Brock Proper ducally gorged also Or. Escutcheon Or a Cross engrailed per cross indented, Azure and Sable in the first quarter an Estoile of the second. Motto Dum Spiro Spero

== Legacy ==
=== Species named after Brooke ===
Some Bornean plant species were named in Brooke's honour:

- Rhododendron brookeanum, a flowering plant named by Hugh Low and John Lindley, now included in Rhododendron javanicum
- Rajah Brooke's pitcher plant (Nepenthes rajah), a pitcher plant named by Joseph Dalton Hooker

also insects:

- Rajah Brooke's birdwing (Trogonoptera brookiana), a butterfly named by Alfred R. Wallace
- Rajah Brooke's stag beetle, Lucanus brookeanus Snellen Van Vollenhoven, 1861 = Odontolabis brookeana, collected by Alfred R. Wallace

three species of reptiles:

- Brooke's house gecko, Hemidactylus brookii
- Brooke's sea snake, Hydrophis brookii
- Brooke's keeled skink, Tropidophorus brookei

and a snail:

- Bertia (Ryssota) brookei (Adams & Reeve, 1848)

=== Places named after Brooke ===
In 1857, the native village of Newash in Grey County, Ontario, Canada, was renamed Brooke and the adjacent township was named Sarawak by William Coutts Keppel (known as Viscount Bury, later the 7th Earl of Albemarle) who was Superintendent of Indian Affairs in Canada. James Brooke was a close friend of Viscount Bury's uncle, Henry Keppel having met in 1843 while fighting pirates off the coast of Borneo. Townships to the northwest of Sarawak were named Keppel and Albemarle. In 2001, Sarawak and Keppel became part of the township of Georgian Bluffs; Albemarle joined the town of South Bruce Peninsula in 1999. Keppel-Sarawak School is located in Owen Sound, Ontario.

Brooke's Point, a major municipality on the island of Palawan, Philippines, is named after him. Both Brooke's Lighthouse and Brooke's Port are historical landmarks in Brooke's Point and are believed to have been constructed by James Brooke. Today, owing to erosion and the constant movement of the tides, only a few stones can still be seen at the Port. The remnants of the original lighthouse tower are still visible, although the area now has a new lighthouse.

== Notes ==
a. The term Rajah reflects traditional usage in Sarawak and English writing, although Raja may be better orthography in Malay. 'Rajah' means 'King'.

== Sources ==
- Barley, Nigel (2002), White Rajah, Time Warner: London. ISBN 978-0-316-85920-2.
- Cavendish, Richard, "Birth of Sir James Brooke", History Today. April 2003, Vol. 53, Issue 4.
- Doering, Jonathan (July 2003). "The Enigmatic Sir James Brooke". Contemporary Review. 282 (1650). Archived from the original on 18 August 2004 – via FindArticles.
- Jacob, Gertrude Le Grand. The Raja of Saráwak: An Account of Sir James Brooks. K.C.B., LL.D., Given Chiefly Through Letters and Journals. London: MacMillan, 1876.
- Rutter, Owen (ed) Rajah Brooke & Baroness Burdett Coutts. Consisting of the letters from Sir James Brooke to Miss Angela, afterwards Baroness, Burdett Coutts 1935.
- Wason, Charles William. The Annual Register: A Review of Public Events at Home and Abroad for the Year 1868. London: Rivingtons, Waterloo Place, 1869. pp. 162–163.

James Brooke Brooke family Born: 29 April 1803 Died: 11 June 1868
Regnal titles
New title Kingdom established	Rajah of Sarawak; 1842–1868	Succeeded by Charles
Government offices
New post	Governor of Labuan; 1848–1853	Succeeded by George Warren Edwardes
