= Charles Brooke, Rajah of Sarawak =

Sir Charles Brooke
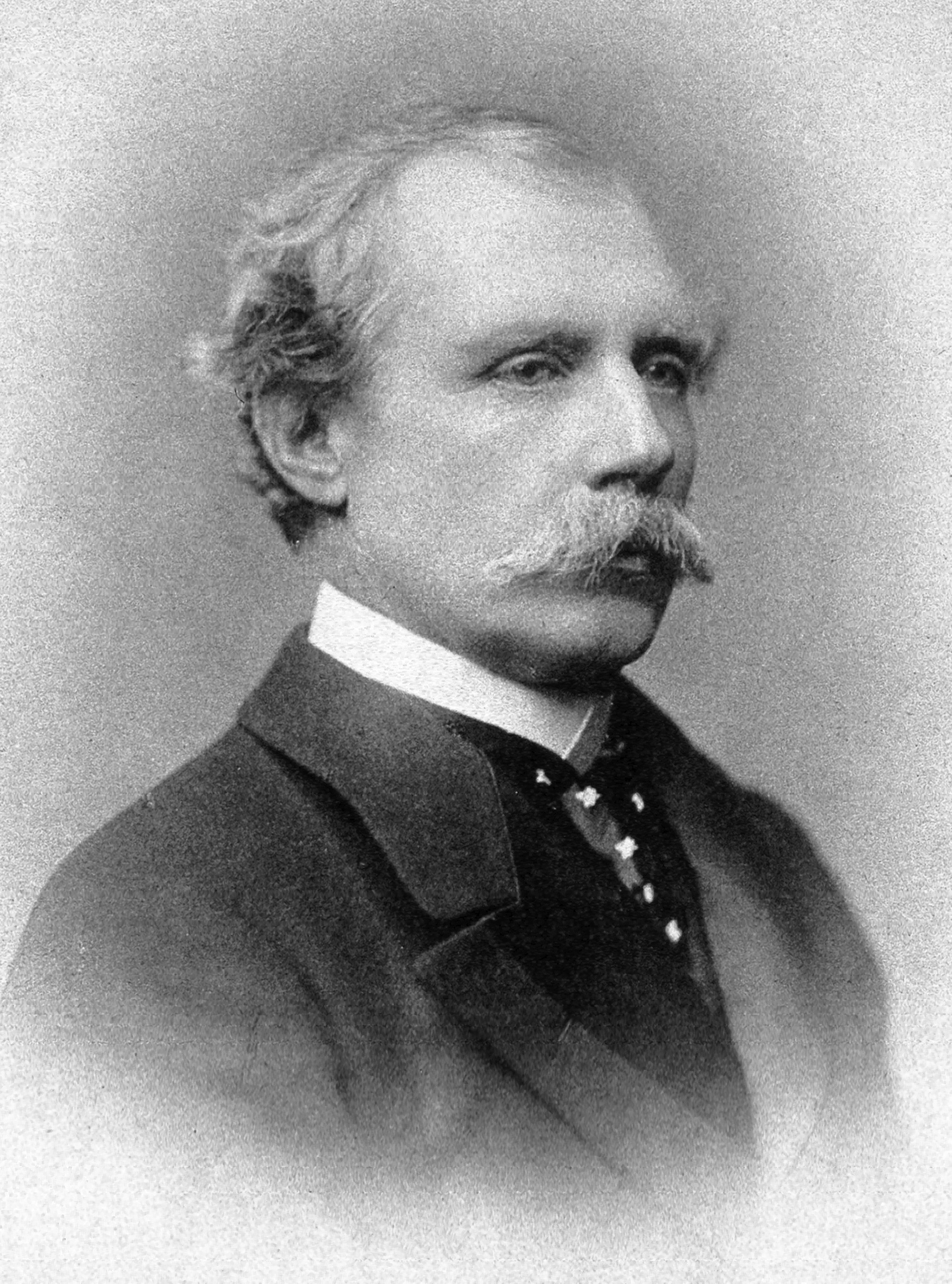

Rajah of Sarawak
- Reign: 3 August 1868 – 17 May 1917
- Predecessor: James Brooke
- Successor: Charles Vyner Brooke
- Born: Charles Anthoni Johnson; 3 June 1829; Berrow Vicarage, Burnham-on-Sea, Somerset, England
- Died: 17 May 1917 (aged 87); Cirencester, Gloucestershire, England
- Burial: St Leonard's Church, Sheepstor on Dartmoor
- Spouses: Dayang Mastiah; Margaret Alice Lili de Windt (m. 1869)
- Issue: with Dayang Mastiah: Esca Brooke-Daykin; with Margaret Alice Lili de Windt: Dayang Ghita; Charles Clayton Johnson; James Harry; Charles Vyner; Bertram Willes Dayrell; Harry Keppel
Names
- Charles Anthoni Johnson Brooke
- House: Brooke
- Father: Francis Johnson
- Mother: Emma Johnson
- Religion: Anglicanism

Military service
- Allegiance: British Empire
- Branch/service: Royal Navy
- Years of service: 1842–1856
- Rank: Lieutenant

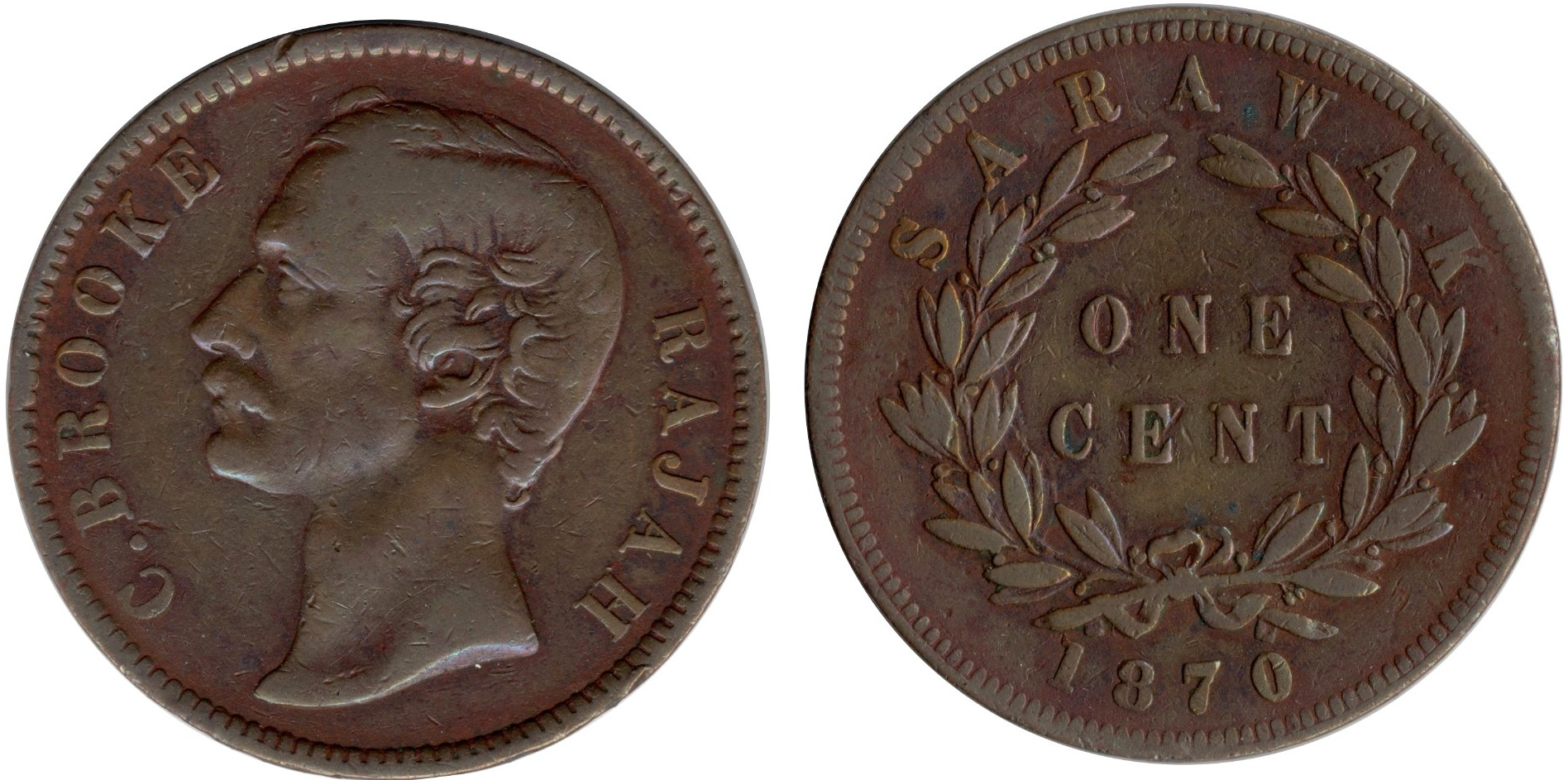
Rajah Charles as depicted on a one cent coin

Sir Charles Anthoni Johnson Brooke (born Charles Anthoni Johnson; 3 June 1829 – 17 May 1917) was the Rajah of Sarawak from 3 August 1868 until his death in May 1917. He succeeded his maternal uncle, James Brooke, who was the first rajah and founder of Raj of Sarawak.

== Early life and education ==
Charles Anthoni Johnson was born in Berrow Vicarage, Burnham, Somerset, in England, to the Reverend Francis Charles and Emma Frances Johnson, née Brooke. Emma was the younger sister of James Brooke, the first Rajah of Sarawak. In addition to Charles, Francis and Emma had other children: Captain John Brooke Johnson (1823–1868) (later Brooke), Mary Anna Johnson (b. 1824), Harriet Helena Johnson (b. 1826), Charlotte Frances Johnson (b. 1828), Captain (William) Frederic Johnson (b. 1830), Emma Lucy Johnson (b. 1832), Margaret Henrietta Johnson (1834–1845), Georgianna Brooke Johnson (1836–1854), James Stuart Johnson (1839–1840), and Henry Stuart Johnson (b. 1841).

Brooke was educated at Crewkerne Grammar School and entered the Royal Navy. He entered the service of his uncle James, the first Rajah of Sarawak, in 1852, took his name, and began as Resident at the Lundu station in the Raj of Sarawak. In the 1857 rebellion against the White Rajah, Charles Brooke helped his uncle put down the rebellion led by Liu Shan Bang with his force composed of Ibans and local Bidayuh tribes. It is noted that Brooke's Iban forces pursued the remaining rebels to Bau, where they killed the 3,000 villagers including women, children and the elderly in a massacre. In 1865, James named Charles as his successor.

=== Early career in Sarawak ===
Brooke resigned his commission in the Royal Navy in 1861 and continued the work his uncle had started, suppressing piracy, slavery, and head-hunting, while encouraging trade and development and expanding the borders of his domain as the opportunities arose. In 1891 he established the Sarawak Museum, the first museum in Borneo. Brooke founded a boys' school in 1903, called the 'Government Lay School', where Malays could be taught in the Malay language. This was the forerunner of SMK Green Road. By the time of his death, Britain had established a protectorate over Sarawak, it had a parliamentary government, a railway, and oil had been discovered.

== Death and succession ==
Brooke's son Charles Vyner Brooke succeeded him as the third and last White Rajah. He had another son, Esca Brooke (1868–1951) from a previous marriage with a Malay woman known as Dayang Mastiah. Esca was sent to England at the age of six, cared for and later adopted by the Reverend William Daykin. Eventually, they moved to Canada. Esca married and had three children. Brooke lost an eye at some point in a riding accident, and allegedly replaced it with a false eye intended for a stuffed albatross.

== Personal life and family ==
Brooke married Margaret Alice Lili de Windt at Highworth, Wiltshire, on 28 October 1869; she was raised to the title of Ranee of Sarawak with the style of Her Highness on the same day. They had six children, three of whom survived infancy:

- Dayang Ghita Brooke (1870–1873)
- James Harry Brooke (1872–1873)
- Charles Clayton Brooke (1872–1873)
- Charles Vyner Brooke, Rajah of Sarawak (1874–1963)
- Bertram Willes Dayrell Brooke, Tuan Muda (1876–1965)
- Henry Keppel Brooke, Tuan Bongsu (1878–1927)

All three White Rajahs are buried in St Leonard's Church in the village of Sheepstor on Dartmoor, Devon.

== Honours ==
- United Kingdom
  - Knight Grand Cross of the Order of St Michael and St George (GCMG) (1888)

== Namesakes ==
Two Bornean species were named in Brooke's honour:

- Brooke's Squirrel (Sundasciurus brookei), named by Oldfield Thomas
- Cervus brookei, a deer named by Charles Hose in 1893

== See also ==
- Fort Margherita

Charles Brooke, Rajah of Sarawak Brooke family Born: June 3 1829 Died: May 17 1917
Regnal titles
Preceded by James	Rajah of Sarawak; 1868–1917	Succeeded by Vyner
