= Liu Shan Bang =

Leader of Chinese uprising in Borneo

- 刘善邦
- Born: 1800; Lufeng, Guangdong, Qing Empire
- Died: February 24, 1857 (aged 56–57); Jugan, Siniawan, Sarawak
- Resting place: Shan Teck Temple, Siniawan, Sarawak
- Occupation: Gold miner

Liu Shan Bang (simplified Chinese: 刘善邦; traditional Chinese: 劉善邦; pinyin: Liú Shànbāng, 1800 – February 24, 1857) was a Chinese gold miner in Bau, Sarawak. He was best known as the leader of the 1857 Chinese miners' revolt against the White Rajah James Brooke.

== History ==
A Hakka born in Lufeng, Guangdong of the Qing dynasty, around 1800, Liu left for Sambas, Borneo, at the age of 20. He is said to have worked at the Sam Tiau Kow (Santiaogou) gold mine there until mistreatment by the Dutch caused him to lead a group of miners to the Bau area of Sarawak (perhaps Pangkalan Tebang). He organised the 'Twelve Kongsi' company which operated the Mau San gold mine and made the mining town of Mau San (or Bau Lama) effectively self-governing.

They unearthed gold deposits and turned Mau San into a prosperous and thriving gold town. Events allegedly took a wrong turn when The White Rajah, James Brooke, imposed high taxes on the gold mine business.

=== Revolt ===
On 18 February 1857, Liu Shan Bang embarked 600 Chinese rebels in large cargo boats at Tondong, Bau District. A Malay trader encountered the Chinese in the afternoon before they started the attack. The trader was allowed to pass after he told them that he must warn his own family so they would not be frightened. The Malay trader then informed another trader named Gapur and Datu Bandar. Both of them were skeptical. Datu Bandar decided not to trouble the Rajah who was unwell and decided to inform the Rajah the next morning.

The Chinese rebels traveled quietly along the Sarawak River and arrived in Kuching just after midnight. Then they divided themselves into two groups. One party was sent to attack the stockades while the rest of them hid in a small creek (a small river stream) named "Sungei Bedil" above the James Brooke residence. James Brooke was reading in his own personal library. James Brooke stayed together with a Malay boy at that time. About 100 Chinese men crept out from the creek and attacked Brooke's residence from the front and back of the house. James Brooke was alerted to the sounds of shouts and yells at night. James fired a few shots into the Chinese attackers above him in futile. James then called along his Malay boy and crept to the bathroom. He and the boy then rushed out of the house. However, he encountered nobody on the lawn. He then dived into the muddy Kuching River and escaped to the other side. James later received help from his escaping officers, Dayaks and Malays. The James Brooke residence, including his personal library was later burnt down by the Chinese.

Five Europeans were killed and properties were burnt, and the town in disarray, with most Europeans sheltering in the grounds of the Anglican Church. The rebels mistook a 17-year-old boy as the White Rajah, beheaded him and paraded his head on a pole around the town.

The next morning, the Chinese paraded the streets. Liu Shan Bang sat in the James Brooke's chair in the courthouse. Liu appointed Helms, the manager of the Borneo Company and Rupell, a trader, to administer the foreign quarter, with the Datu Bandar administering the Malay community. However, after a day in Kuching, Liu learnt that James Brooke was still alive. Realising that James Brooke would team up with his nephew Charles Brooke to organise a bigger expedition team against them, Liu withdrew to Bau on 24 February 1857. On the way to Bau, Liu's team was attacked by a small group of Rajah's Malay supporters.

=== Death ===
However, only a day later, Liu had discovered that the White Rajah was still alive. In retaliation, Brooke enlisted the help of his Malay supporters, while his nephew Charles Brooke sailed from Lingga with a force of Iban soldiers. On 23 February Charles led a force of Ibans to join up with the local Bidayuh tribes in pursuit of Liu and his rebels.

The following day, while on the way back to Bau, Liu and his rebels were under attack by the Rajah's Iban forces. Liu managed to regroup at Jugan in Siniawan, but was heavily outnumbered. There Liu was shot dead and his rebels were killed.

Charles' Iban forces pursued the remaining rebels to Bau, where they slaughtered the 3,000 villagers including women, children and old folks in a massacre and left their bodies to rot.

== Legacy ==
A stone was placed to mark his grave, and a small temple erected by it, although the reason was kept secret for over a century. Liu was elevated by the community to a deity named "Shin". The temple at Liu Shan Bang's grave site is named the Sien Teck Temple (Chinese: 善德庙; pinyin: Shàndé Miào) and is located at Lorong 2 Jalan Jungan in Siniawan Town, Bau_District.

On 27 July 1993, Liu Shan Bang was included in the 'freedom fighters, liberators, and martyrs' unveiled on the new Heroes' Monument in the Sarawak Museum Garden.

In 2015, Guat Peng Ngoi, Assistant Professor at the Division of Chinese, School of Humanities and Social Sciences of Nanyang Technological University, Singapore, stated that Liu Shan Bang images were constructed by people's memories and folklore, which often contradicts colonial narratives. These make Liu Shan Bang a fictional character.
