= Chinese Miners' Revolt at Bau =

1857 uprising of Chinese gold miners in Sarawak

Chinese Miners’ Revolt at Bau
| Date | 19 February – early March 1857 |
| Location | Bau and Kuching, Raj of Sarawak |
| Result | Brooke government victory |

Belligerents
| Raj of Sarawak; Supported by Malay and Dayak allies | Chinese kongsi miners of Bau |

Commanders and leaders
| James Brooke | Liu Shan Bang (刘善邦) † |

Strength
| Unknown; included Malay and Dayak forces | c. 400–600 (modern estimates) up to 1,000–3,000 (contemporary accounts) |

Casualties and losses
| Several European and local officials killed; others wounded | Heavy; many killed during retreat and pursuit |

The Chinese Miners’ Revolt at Bau was an uprising in February 1857 by Chinese gold miners based in Bau in the Raj of Sarawak against the rule of James Brooke, the first White Rajah. The revolt culminated in a surprise attack on Kuching, the capital of Sarawak, before being suppressed by Brooke's forces with assistance from local allies and Dutch authorities in neighboring Dutch Borneo. The suppression of the attack consolidated the authority of the Brooke administration over the Bau area and its mining operations.

== Background ==
During the mid-19th century, Bau was a major center of gold mining worked largely by Chinese migrants, many of them Hakka organised into autonomous mining associations known as kongsi (Chinese: 公司; pinyin: gōngsī; literally "company" or "association"). In the context of Southeast Asian mining frontiers, kongsi referred not merely to commercial partnerships but to self-governing corporate communities. These organisations combined economic, social, and political functions: They regulated mining operations, adjudicated disputes, maintained armed forces, and managed relations with indigenous groups and regional authorities. In western Borneo, including Bau, several kongsi federations emerged, sometimes forming larger alliances that exercised de facto territorial control. Although initially tolerated by James Brooke's administration, their autonomy increasingly came into conflict with the expanding authority of the Raj of Sarawak.

Tensions developed between the Brooke government and the Chinese mining communities over issues including taxation, jurisdiction, and trade restrictions, particularly relating to the trading of opium. The Brooke administration sought to bring the kongsi under tighter control by imposing fines and levies not only in connection with opium revenue, but also for alleged breaches of mining regulations, unauthorized trade, and resistance to government authority. These measures, together with attempts to curtail kongsi autonomy and assert judicial authority over their members, contributed to growing resentment among the miners.

== Revolt ==
On 19 February 1857, a force of Chinese miners from Bau, led by Liu Shan Bang, a Hakka miner who had organized the company operating the Mau San gold mine, launched a coordinated attack and advanced downriver toward Kuching. Liu is described in both contemporary and later accounts as a leading figure within the Bau kongsi system, likely acting as a principal organizer and commander of the attack. Modern historical estimates suggest that approximately 400 to 600 miners took part in the attack on Kuching. However, some earlier accounts - particularly those derived from Brooke-era reports - give significantly higher numbers, sometimes claiming that as many as 1,000 to 3,000 Chinese were involved, although these figures are generally regarded by later historians as exaggerated.

The attack force descended the Sarawak River and entered Kuching before dawn, taking advantage of minimal defenses and the element of surprise. The attackers quickly overran key government positions, set fire to buildings, and looted the treasury. Several European officials and residents were killed in the initial assault, while others fled the town. Among the killed were the two sons of police inspector Joseph Middleton (John and Charles Middleton, aged six and four years) and Richard Wellington, a clerk in the Borneo Company Limited. Among those wounded in the attack were Arthur Crookshank, a Brooke administration official, and his young wife, who was reportedly left for dead. James Brooke himself narrowly escaped capture, reportedly fleeing with only a small entourage upriver to seek refuge and organize resistance.

Despite their initial success, the rebels did not consolidate control over Kuching. Discipline among the attackers appears to have weakened as looting spread, and no stable authority was established. Brooke, meanwhile, rapidly mobilized loyal Malay followers and Dayak forces, gathering support from upriver regions. Within days, these forces began to counterattack and reoccupy the town. As Brooke's forces advanced, the rebels withdrew from Kuching and retreated toward Bau. In the pursuit that followed, many were killed in engagements along the river routes or while attempting to escape into the interior. Liu Shan Bang himself was killed during the retreat, effectively depriving the uprising of central leadership. By early March 1857, the revolt had largely collapsed. Surviving participants either dispersed into the interior or fled across the border into Dutch Borneo, where some were subsequently pursued or detained with the cooperation of Dutch colonial authorities.

== Aftermath ==
In the aftermath of the revolt, the Brooke government consolidated its authority over the Bau mining district. The autonomy of the Chinese kongsi system was dismantled, and mining operations increasingly came under the control of European commercial interests, particularly the Borneo Company Limited. The events of 1857 had lasting consequences for ethnic relations and colonial governance in Sarawak, reinforcing Brooke reliance on indigenous allies and shaping subsequent policies toward Chinese communities.

== See also ==
- Bau, Sarawak
- Raj of Sarawak
- White Rajah
- History of Sarawak
- Expeditions of the White Rajahs of Sarawak
