= Fairy Cave =

Fairy Cave may refer to:

- Fairy Cave (Jiangxi)
- Fairy Cave (Colorado), part of the extensive cave system of Glenwood Caverns
- Fairy Cave (Victoria), one of the Buchan Caves
- Fairy Cave (Sarawak), one of the Caves of Malaysia
- Fairy Cave (Bau)
- Fairy Cave (Somerset), one of the Caves of the Mendip Hills
- Dog Hole Cave, Storth, Cumbria, England, also known as Fairy Cave
- Talking Rocks Cavern, Stone County, Missouri, previously known as Fairy Cave
