= Frank Richardson =

Frank Richardson may refer to:

- Frank Richardson (Australian footballer) (1897–1970), Australian footballer
- Frank Richardson (director) (1898–1962), Anglo-American film director
- Frank Richardson (footballer, born 1897) (1897–1987), English footballer
- Frank Richardson (police officer) (1851–1938), member of the British Constabulary in Birmingham
- Frank Richardson (runner) (born 1955), American marathon runner
- Frank Richardson (swimmer) (born 1962), Nicaraguan Olympic swimmer
- Frank K. Richardson (1914–1999), associate justice of the California Supreme Court

== See also ==
- Francis Richardson (1815–1896), merchant
- Francis Northey Richardson (1894–1983), British brewer
