= Bau, Sarawak =

Bau
- Town and district capital
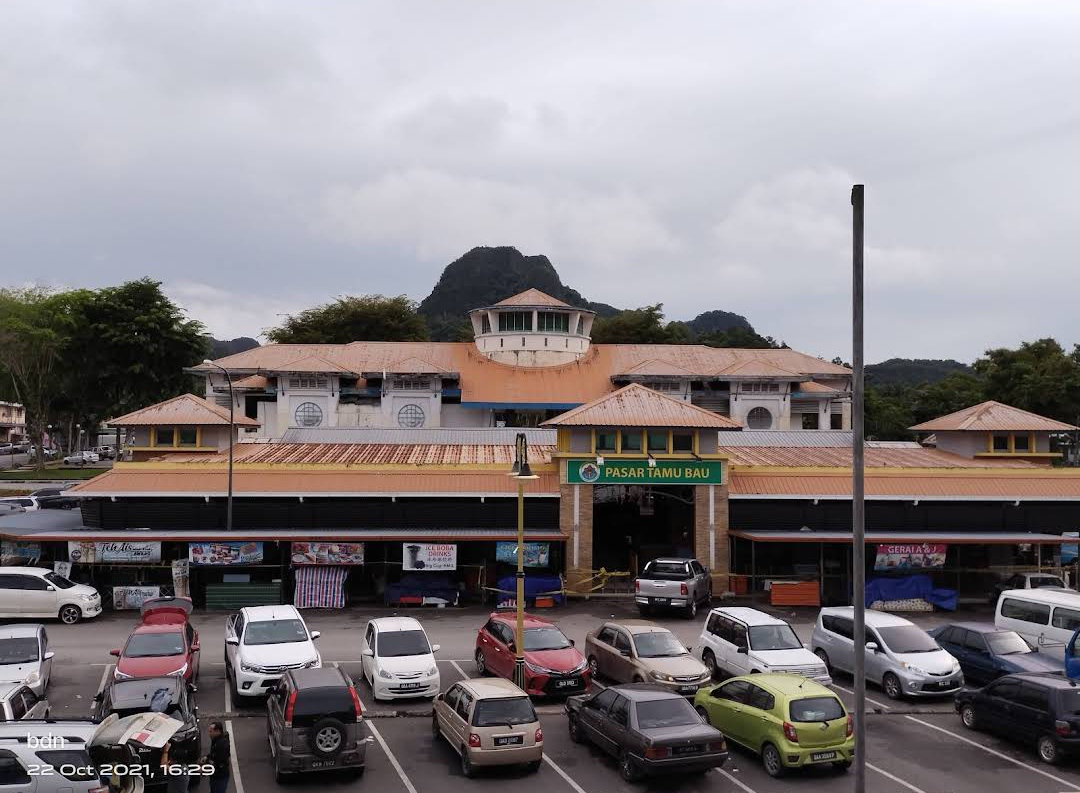
- Bau Market

- Seal

- Location within Sarawak Location within Malaysia
- Coordinates: 1°25′0″N 110°0′9″E
- Country: Malaysia
- State: Sarawak
- Division: Kuching
- District: Bau

Area
  - Total: 884.4 km^{2} (341.5 sq mi)
- Time zone: UTC+08:00 (Malaysian Standard Time)
- Postal code(s): 94000
- Area codes: +6082 (Landline) +6012 & +6013 (Mobile)
- ISO 3166 code: Part of MY-13

Bau is a gold mining town, the capital of Bau District in the Kuching Division of Sarawak, Malaysia. It is 29 km from Batu Kawah and 70 km from Serian.

== Names and etymology ==
The origin of the name "Bau" is uncertain, but it is commonly believed to derive from a local (Bidayuh or Malay) word meaning "smell" or "odor". This has been interpreted in relation to the environmental conditions of the area, including mineral-rich soils and mining activity that may have produced distinctive smells. Another explanation for the etymology derived from "odor" is that the 1837 Skrang Iban attack on the Jagoi‑Bratak Bidayuh settlement - in which more than 2,000 people were killed - left such a strong smell of decay in the surrounding valleys that the area subsequently became associated with the odor.

The historical Chinese mining town of Old Bau was also known by the Chinese name of Maw San (Chinese: 帽山; pinyin: Màoshān) which literally means "hat mountain" and refers to the distinct hat-like shape of the nearby Krian Mountain (Malay: Gunung Krian). It could hence be that "Bau" is derived from "Maw". The most commonly used modern Chinese name for Bau is Shilongmen (Chinese: 石隆门; pinyin: Shílóngmén) literally "Prosperous Stone Gateway".

== History ==
On 1 May 1837, the Skrang Ibans invaded the Jagoi-Bratak Bidayuh settlement on top of Bratak Peak, killing over 2,000 Jagoi-Bratak Bidayuh men and taking 1,000 women captive. Panglima Kulow, head of Jagoi-Bratak Bidayuh community, and a handful of his followers survived the massacre. In 1841 James Brooke, who was then the newly installed White Rajah of Sarawak, was able to rescue some of the women taken captive. Each year on 1 May, descendants of the survivors of the 1837 massacre hold Jagoi-Bratak Day on top of Bratak Hill in Bau in memory of their ancestors. A memorial stone was erected on 1 May 1988, to mark the day.

=== Gold mining ===
The Hakka Chinese first began gold mining in Bau in the 1800s, centred at Pangkalan Tebang. Local Chinese oral history put the establishment of first Chinese settlement in Bau at 1830. Chinese immigration into Bau halted temporarily in 1836 during the civil war between Kuching Malays and Bruneian Malays. Influx of Hakka Chinese from Sambas District in Dutch Borneo to Bau continued after James Brooke was proclaimed Rajah at downriver Kuching in 1841. In 1850, more Chinese came from Pemangkat in Dutch Borneo to escape from inter-Chinese Kongsi rivalry there. Settlements around Bau (also known as Upper Sarawak) were governed by a kongsi headquartered in Bau, independent of James Brooke's rule.

The friction of the jurisdiction and taxation of Chinese Kongsi with the Brooke government and the $150 fine for smuggling opium imposed by the Brookes led to the Bau uprising on 19 February 1857. About 600 gold miners, led by Liu Shan Bang, took over Kuching town, the administrative centre of the Brooke government. Amongst those who were killed during the uprising were police inspector P. Middleton and his family, R. Wellington, an employee of Borneo Company Limited (BCL), 19-year-old Harry Nicholettes, the Lundu Resident, and a Malay Corporal. The Sarawak Treasury was ransacked, including $6,359 belonging The Borneo Company. The gold miners called a meeting that involved Bishop, Ludvig Verner Helms (manager of BCL), Ruppell (a private merchant trading with BCL), and the Datu Bandar. Agreements were signed so that "Mr Helms and Mr Ruppell were to rule the foreign portion of the town [Kuching], and the Datu Bandar the Malays, under the [gold miners’] Kongsi as supreme rulers.” and “the Chinese should go up the river the same day ... the Malays should not attack them ... no steamers or boats should be sent up the river in pursuit.” On 23 February, BCL steamship named Sir James Brooke returned from Singapore. James Brooke, Helms, and others boarded the steamship. Flanked by a flotilla of small boats, the steamship sailed upriver in pursuit of the retreating Chinese gold miners. James Brooke retook the town of Kuching on the same day. Building upon the victory, Tuan Muda Charles Brooke led several hundreds of Dayaks from Skrang and Saribas in pursuit of the 2,000 Chinese gold miners that retreated to Sambas, Dutch Borneo. On the order of James Brooke, Helms went to Dutch Borneo to seek cooperation to exterminate the remaining Chinese gold miners. The Dutch authorities agreed and by 15 March 1857, peace was restored and Helms returned to Sarawak on a Dutch warship.

After the uprising was quashed by the Brookes, the mining operations were gradually taken over by The Borneo Company with the last Chinese syndicate being bought out in 1884. In 1898, The Borneo Company introduced the cyanide process for extracting the gold, which led to increased environmental pollution. The mines were closed in 1921 because most of the minerals, easily reachable by existing techniques, had been removed. But during the Great Depression Chinese miners continued to artisanally mine the deposits. The mines were reopened in the late 1970s when world gold prices soared, but were closed down again in 1996 when the Asian financial crisis started. The last mining occurred at the Tai Parit open-pit mine.

In 2002, Preston Resources began exploratory development of the mining leases formerly held by Malaysia's Oriental Peninsula Gold (now Peninsula Gold Ltd.). In 2006, Zedex Minerals purchased a controlling interest in the exploratory leases. Zedex was primarily concerned with determining the extent and richness of the remaining Jugan gold deposits, but it also assayed the old tailings at the Bukit Young Gold Mine site for potential reprocessing. In 2009 Zedex was merged into Olympus Pacific Minerals. As of 2014, the mining rights were held by North Borneo Gold, a joint venture of Besra Gold (aka Olympus Pacific Minerals), Golden Celesta and Gladioli Enterprises, a Malaysian mining group. As of May 2017, the mines have not reopened.

== Geography ==
The gold deposits in Bau Township occur in the Jugan Hills in marine sedimentary rocks of late Jurassic to early Cretaceous age, primarily limestone. The gold comes from hydrothermal sources activated by local volcanism. The gold is found in four distinct configurations: disseminated throughout the mineralized sediments; as silica replacement; in breccias having magno-calcite quartz veining; and occasionally as porphyritic skarns.

The limestone cliffs in the area support a wide range of endemic flora, including the rare pitcher plant Nepenthes northiana.

== Economic activities ==
According to a survey by Bau District Office (Majlis Daerah Bau), there are ten major economic activities that available in Bau Township (Pekan Bau) and their surrounding areas in Bau District :

- Agricultural sector
- Livestock & agrotechnology business
- Commercial retail & shop business activities
- Primary and secondary schools education
- Healthcare and lifestyle activities
- Community social and welfare activities
- Local and international festival & events
- Local history & archives preservation
- Flora, fauna, and forestry preservation
- Local and regional tourism sector

== Demographics ==
Bidayuh is the majority ethnic in Bau with 50.1% of total population, followed by Chinese (19%), Malays (14%), and Iban (9.2%).

Ethnic groups in Bau, Sarawak (2025)
| Ethnics | Percent |
| Malays | 14% |
| Chinese | 19% |
| Iban | 9.2% |
| Bidayuh | 50.1% |
| Orang Ulu | 2% |
| Melanau | 5.3% |
| Indian | 0.1% |
| Non-citizens | 0.3% |

== Governance ==
| No. | Constituency | Name | Political party | Notes |
|---|---|---|---|---|
| N01 | Opar | Billy Sujang | GPS | |
| N02 | Tasik Biru | Henry Harry Jinep | GPS | |
| N18 | Serembu | Miro Simuh | GPS | |

== Education infrastructure ==
=== Primary schools ===
- SK Tringgus
- SK Tembawang
- SK Sungai Pinang
- SK Suba Buan
- SK Stass
- SK St Teresa (M)
- SK St Stephen (M)
- SK St Patrick (M)
- SK St John (M)
- SK Skibang
- SK Siniawan
- SK Simpang Kuda
- SK Serumbu
- SK Serasot
- SK Serabak
- SK Senibong
- SK Segubang
- SK Segong
- SK Sebobok
- SK Puak
- SK Podam
- SK Pedaun Bawah
- SK Opar
- SK Kampung Bobak/Sejinjang
- SK Jagoi
- SK Gumbang
- SK Grogo
- SK Buso
- SK Bau
- SK Atas
- SK Apar
- SJK (C) Chung Hua Tondong
- SJK (C) Chung Hua Taiton
- SJK (C) Chung Hua Siniawan
- SJK (C) Chung Hua Sebuku
- SJK (C) Chung Hua Paku
- SJK (C) Chung Hua Musi
- SJK (C) Chung Hua Kranji
- SJK (C) Chung Hua Buso
- SJK (C) Chung Hua Bau

=== Secondary schools ===
- SMK Paku (S)
- SMK Lake
- SMK Bau
- SMK Singai (open on 25 June 2018 as the 4th secondary school in Bau District)

=== Colleges ===
- Kolej Komuniti Mas Gading, Bau
- GIATMARA Mas Gading, Senggi Poak Land District, Singai-Tondong, Bau

== Attractions and recreational spots ==
In 2022, Roxy Tasik Biru Resort opened to the public. It is equipped with a floating bridge, fountain, chalets, a café, and a boat ride service. Fairy Cave and Wind Cave are located in the Bau District.

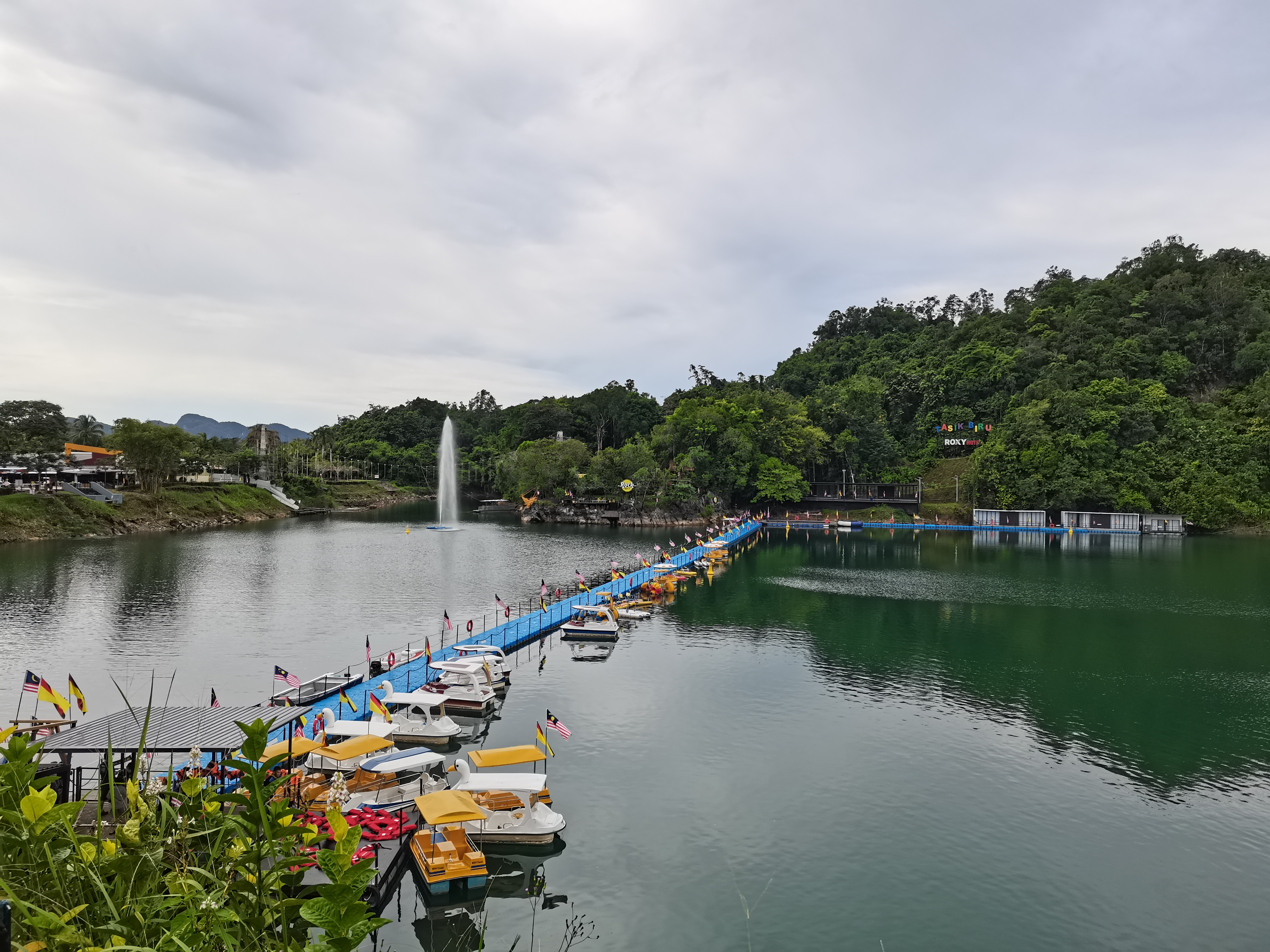
Floating bridge and a small resort at Tasik Biru.

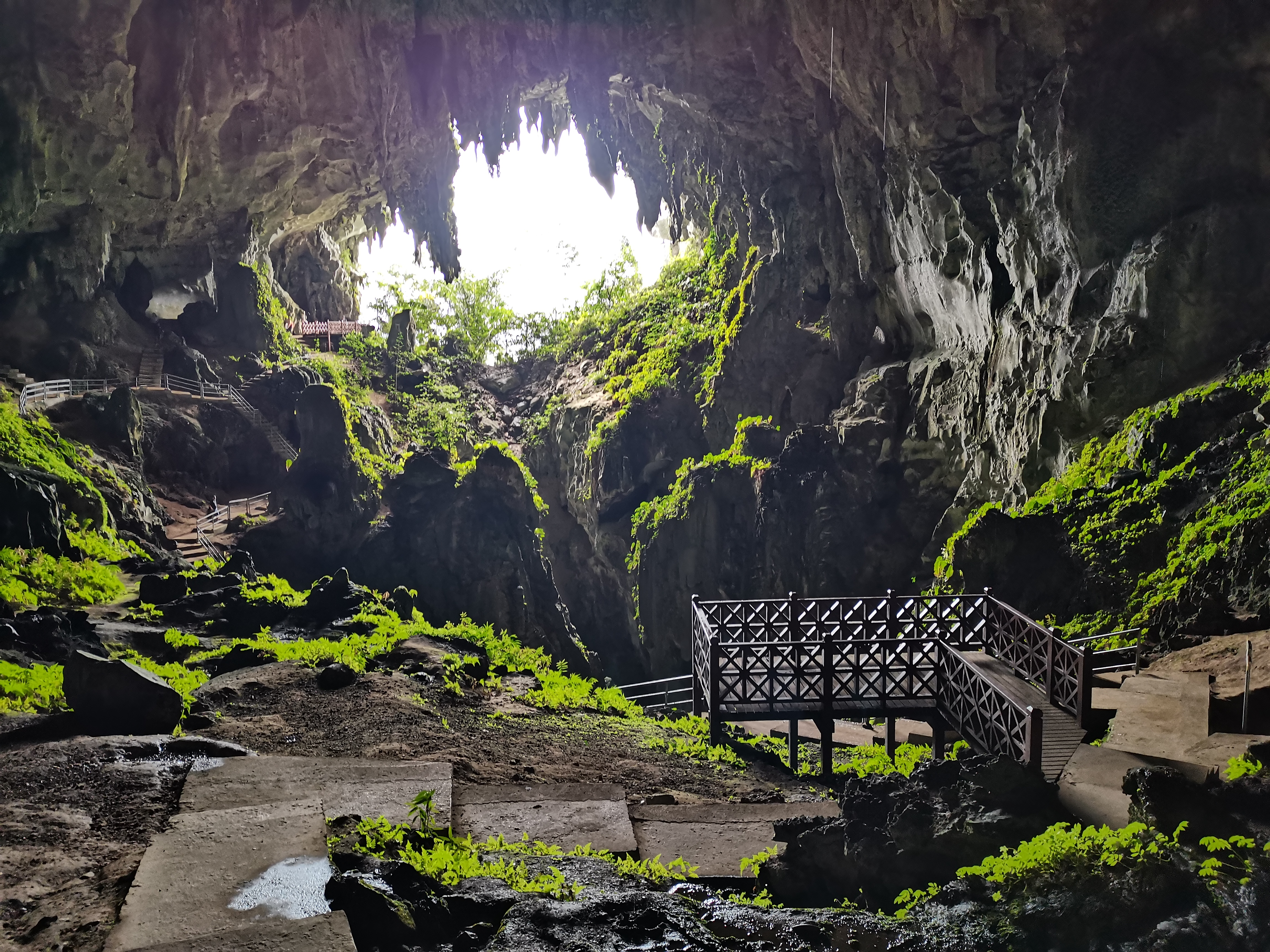
The Fairy Cave Chamber.

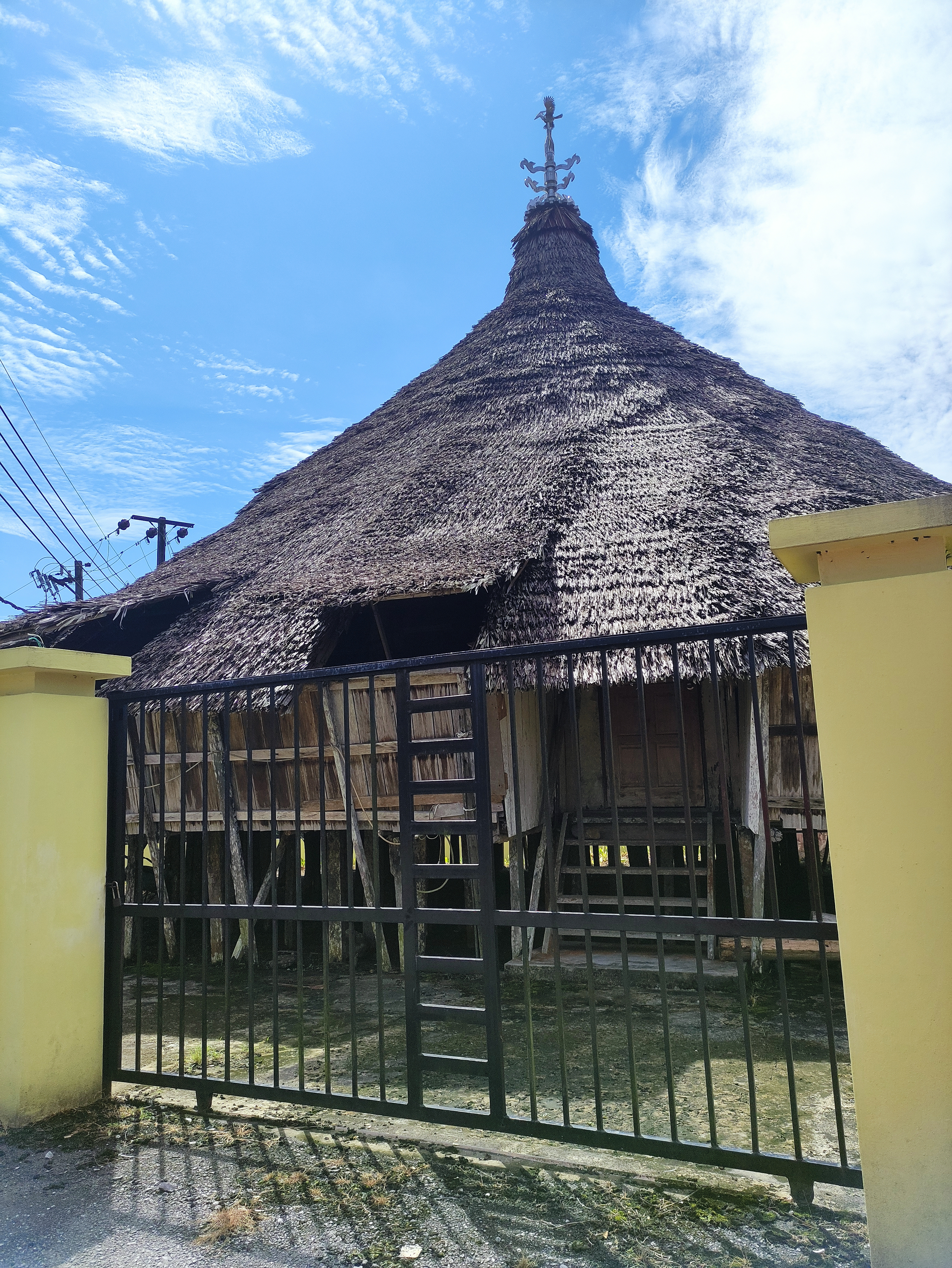
Bidayuh baruk in Kampung Opar, built since 1800s.

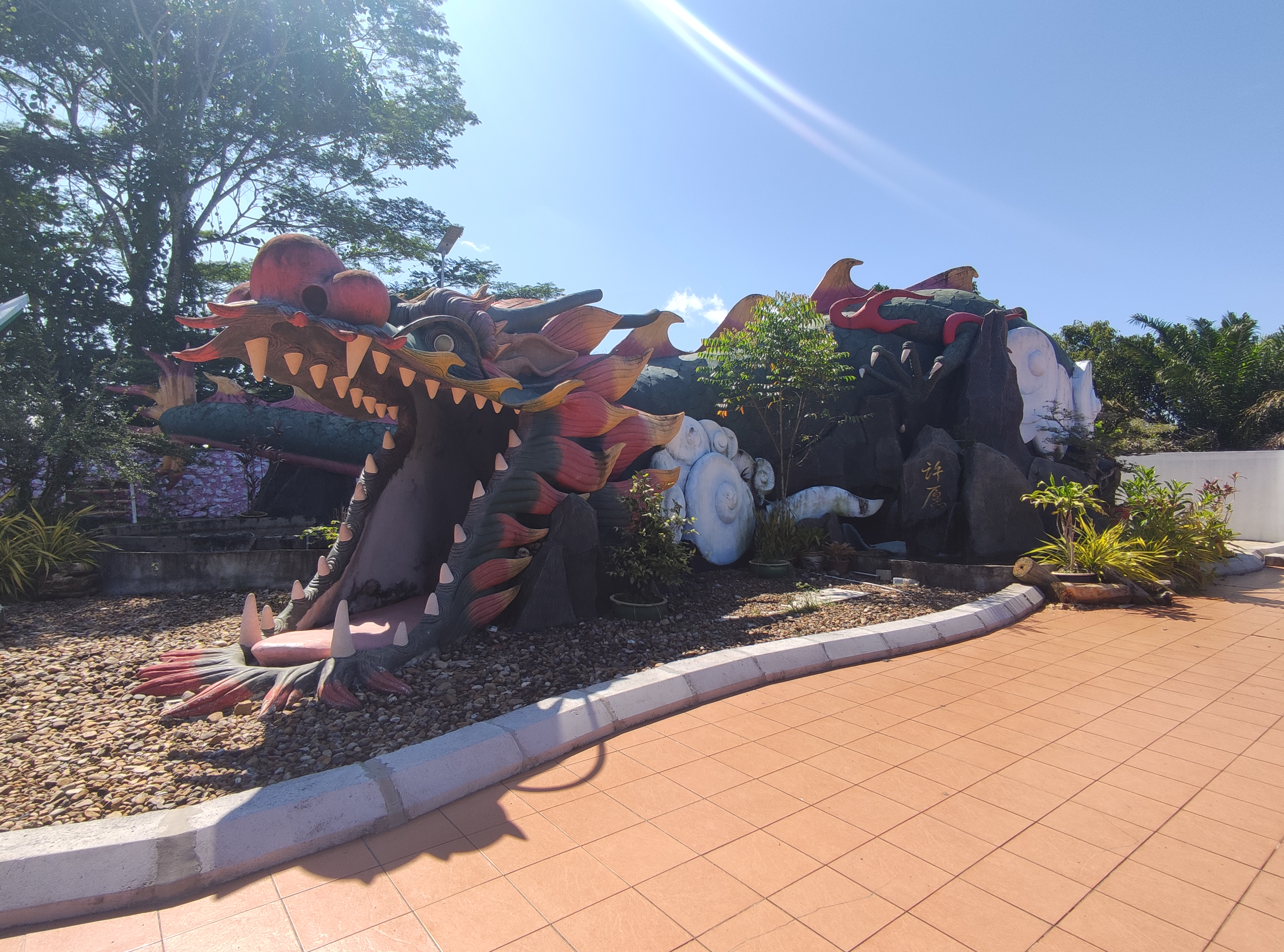
Dragon sculpture in Lung Hua Kong temple, Musi.

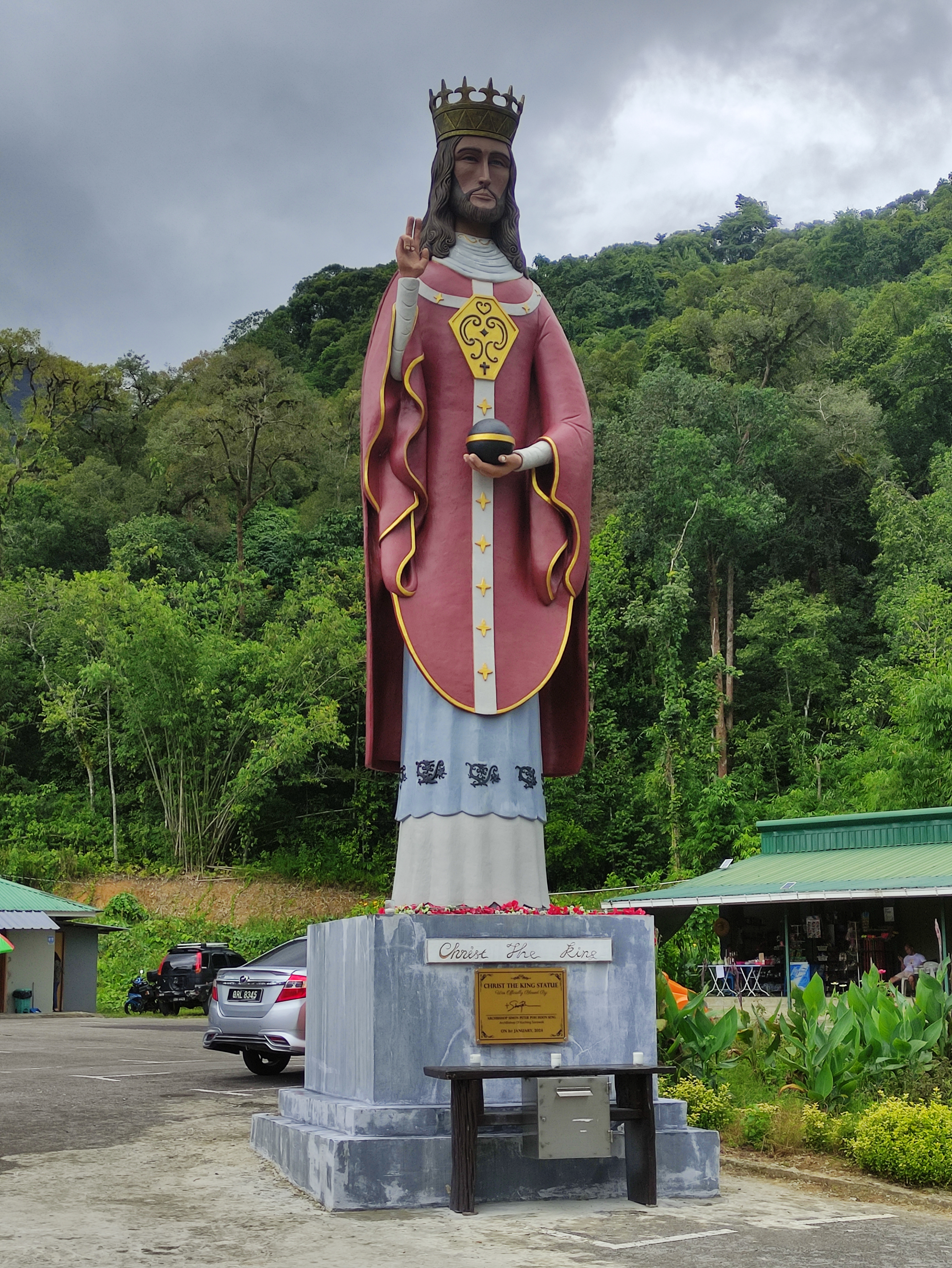
Statue of Christ the King in Mount Singai

Apart from that, Bau District area also have new modern commercial areas such as ROXY Tasik Biru Resort City Shophouse (which is already completed in 2024) and Bau Golden Square (still under construction). For the cultural and sport sector, Bau District area will have the new Bidayuh Cultural Centre (Pusat Kebudayaan Bidayuh, Jambusan, Bau) and new Bau Sports Arena which is located at Jambusan area in Bau.

== See also ==
- Sarawak
- Kuching
- Batu Kawah
- Padawan municipality
- Bau District
- Lundu
- Samarahan
- Serian
- Sri Aman

== Notable people ==
- Irene Chang, politician
- Jamilah Anu, politician
- Liu Shan Bang, Chinese gold miner
- Pandelela Rinong, 2012 Olympic medallist for diving, 2016 Olympic medallist for diving, Bidayuh girl from Kampung Jugan, Bau.
