= Dog hole =

Dog hole may refer to:

- a hole in a workbench in which a bench dog is installed
- Dog Hole Cave, a cave and archaeological site in Cumbria, England
- Dog-hole ports
