= Jagoi language =

Austronesian language spoken in Sarawak, Malaysia

Jagoi
- Bau
- Native to: Malaysia
- Region: Sarawak
- Native speakers: (29,000 cited 2000 census)
- Language family: Austronesian: Malayo-Polynesian; Land Dayak; Bidayuh; Biatah–Tringgus; Jagoi
- Dialects: Gumbang?

Language codes
- ISO 639-3: sne
- Glottolog: baub1235

Jagoi, Singai or Bau, is a Dayak language of Borneo. Gumbang dialect may be closer to Tringgus.

== Dialects ==
Bau language is divided into seven dialects, namely:

- Jagoi - notably from Serikin, Stass, Serasot etc., towards Kampung Selampit in Lundu, Sarawak,
- Bratak - used in kupua (kampung/villages) around the Bung Bratak (Bratak Hill),
- Singai - used in the area and villages around the Catholic site of Mount Singai (from Kampung Apar towards kampung Bobak),
- Biroih - used from Kampung Skiat area towards Kampung Seropak and towards Peninjau Lama (Serumbu area) who originated from Mount Podam,
- Krokuang/Krokong - used in the Krokong area in Bau, Sarawak,
- Gumbang - in Gumbang area, and
- Tringgus - in Kampung Tringgus.
