= Begonia lichenora =

Scientific classification
- Kingdom: Plantae
- Clade: Tracheophytes
- Clade: Angiosperms
- Clade: Eudicots
- Clade: Rosids
- Order: Cucurbitales
- Family: Begoniaceae
- Genus: Begonia
- Species: B. lichenora

Binomial name
- Begonia lichenora C.W.Lin & C.I Peng

Species of flowering plant

Begonia lichenora, the lichen begonia (地衣狀秋海棠) is a species of flowering plant in the family Begoniaceae, native to Borneo. The species is notable for its vine-like, creeping growth habit, and is sometimes grown in terrariums by hobbyists. It was first described in 2017.

== Habitat ==
B. lichenora is endemic to Borneo, in Bau District, Sarawak and Padawan, Sarawak along the Indonesian border. It grows along the soil on the shady slopes of dipterocarp forests at an elevation of around 100 m (330 ft).

== Etymology ==
The name lichenora refers to the way the leaves grow pressed very close to the substrate, giving it an appearance similar to lichen.
