= Mount Singai =

Mountain in Sarawak, Malaysia

Highest point
- Elevation: 562 m (1,844 ft)
- Prominence: 511 m (1,677 ft)
- Isolation: 8 km (5.0 mi)
- Coordinates: 1.5047530466295636°N 110.16541098462402°E

Naming
- Native name: Dorod Singai (Bau Bidayuh)

Geography
- Country: Malaysia
- State: Sarawak
- Division: Kuching
- District: Bau

Mount Singai (Bau Bidayuh: Dorod Singai) is a mountain located in Bau District, Kuching Division, Sarawak. The mount is located 25km southwest of Kuching.

== History ==
Legend has it that the Bidayuh Singai who are also called Bisingai settled in Bukit Singai in the early 1800s. The Bisingai live in eight villages on the slopes of the Singai hills. Many people live in the longhouses, and each longhouses has its own traditional chief.

In 1885, Felix Westerwoudt, a Roman Catholic priest from the Netherlands, established a mission church in a longhouse at Mount Singai. After many people converted to Christianity, they largely moved to the foothills of the mountains and settled there. Therefore, Mount Singai is said to be the birthplace of Christianity among the Bidayuh people.

== Landmarks ==
=== Catholic Memorial and Pilgrimage Centre ===
On 12 July 1981, during the 100th celebration of the Catholic Church in Sarawak, a parish-level celebration was held at the Bukit Singai mission place. This was anticipated by an Austrian priest, Josef Schmolzer who is credited with pioneering the establishment of the Catholic Memorial and Pilgrimage Centre. The center was built with cooperation of the parishioners and blessed by Archbishop Chung on November 21, 1999. During the 2000 Jubilee program, this site was dedicated to Christ the King.

In the centre, there is a Stations of the Cross that starts from the crest of the mountain and each station is marked by a wooden cross.

=== Statue of Christ the King ===
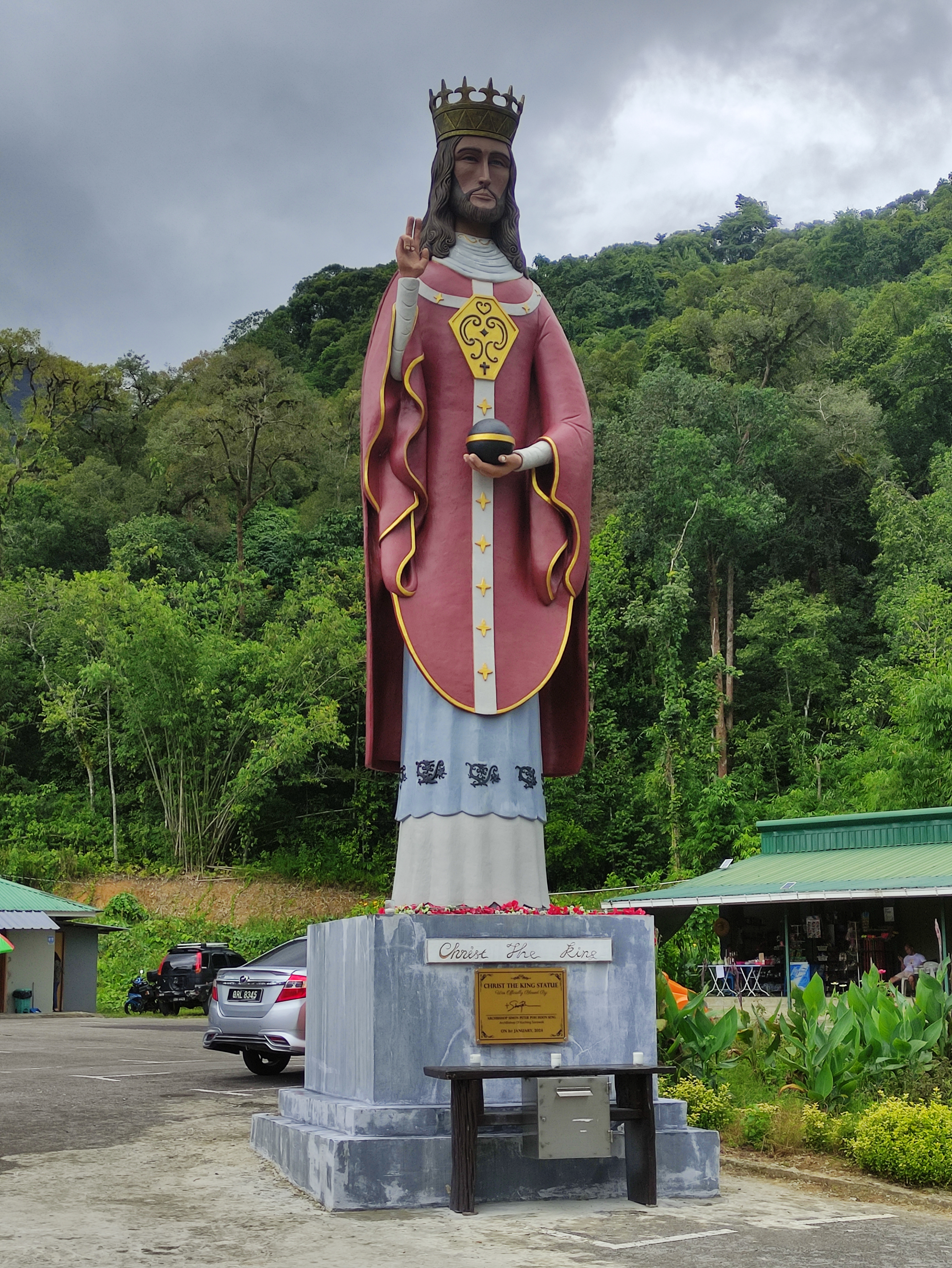
Statue of Christ the King

The statue, erected at the entrance of Mount Singai, is an iconic symbol of faith for Christians in Sarawak. The statue was blessed by Archbishop Simon Poh during a Mass on January 1, 2024.

== Biodiversity ==
Research conducted by the University of Malaysia Sarawak (UNIMAS) has discovered at least 30 species of amphibians and 19 species of reptiles. The mountain also contains 1,178 plant species belonging to 69 families, 123 genera, and about 200 species. The 'spike moss' family (Selaginellaceae - 16.6 percent) dominates this area while the Begoniaceae (8.2 percent) and 'Candlenut trees' or 'Indian Walnut' families (Euphorbiaceae - 6.4 percent) are a distant second and third, respectively. These plants include fruit trees, ferns, medicinal herbs, shrubs, palms, bamboos, and epiphytes.

Of the 1,178 plant species collected on the hill, a total of 254 fruit trees from 12 different families were recorded. Many of these fruit trees are found in foothills and abandoned village sites. The most common is langsat (Lansium domesticum) followed by durian (Durio zibethinus), tampoi (Baccaurea macrocarpa), mangosteen (Garcinia mangostana) and rambai (Baccaurea motleyana).
