= Pelaman Mawiang Togug =

Settlement in Sarawak, Malaysia

- Location within Borneo
- Coordinates: 1.45°N 110.11667°E
- Country: Malaysia
- State: Sarawak
- Elevation: 68 m (223 ft)

Pelaman Mawiang Togug (also known as Plaman Mawiang Togug) is a settlement in Sarawak, Malaysia. It lies approximately 28.3 kilometres (18 mi) west-south-west of the state capital Kuching.

Neighbouring settlements include:

- Kampung Gerogo 0 kilometres (0.0 mi) north
- Kampung Siburuh 1.9 kilometres (1.2 mi) east
- Pelaman Semaya 1.9 kilometres (1.2 mi) west
- Pelaman Tiguduong 1.9 kilometres (1.2 mi) north
- Pelaman Mawiang Tubon 2.6 kilometres (1.6 mi) northwest
- Tundong 3.7 kilometres (2.3 mi) east
