= Tondong =

- Location within Borneo
- Coordinates: 1.45°N 110.15°E
- Country: Malaysia
- State: Sarawak
- District: Bau
- Elevation: 61 m (200 ft)

Tondong (Chinese: 短廊) is a settlement on the Sarawak Kanan (right hand, going upstream) river in the Bau district of Sarawak, Malaysia. It lies approximately 25.2 kilometres (16 mi) southwest of the state capital Kuching.

Tondong has about twenty shophouses on roads perpendicular to the river, but some are now used as residences only. The town was flooded to a depth of 4.6 metres in 1963 and to 3.5 metres in 1976.

Sir Henry Keppel in 1846 describes Tondong as “quite a new settlement”, and the principal Chinese station in the area.

Neighbouring settlements include:

- Kampung Siburuh 1.9 kilometres (1.2 mi) west
- Buso 3.7 kilometres (2.3 mi) east
- Pelaman Mawiang Togug 3.7 kilometres (2.3 mi) west
- Kampung Grogo 3.7 kilometres (2.3 mi) west
- Bau 3.7 kilometres (2.3 mi) south
- Musi 4.1 kilometres (2.5 mi) northeast
- Pelaman Tiguduong 4.1 kilometres (2.5 mi) northwest
- Pelaman Sepisa 4.1 kilometres (2.5 mi) northeast
- Kampung Sudoh 4.1 kilometres (2.5 mi) northeast
- Kampung Addis 4.1 kilometres (2.5 mi) northwest
