= Bratak Hill =

Hill in Sarawak, Malaysia

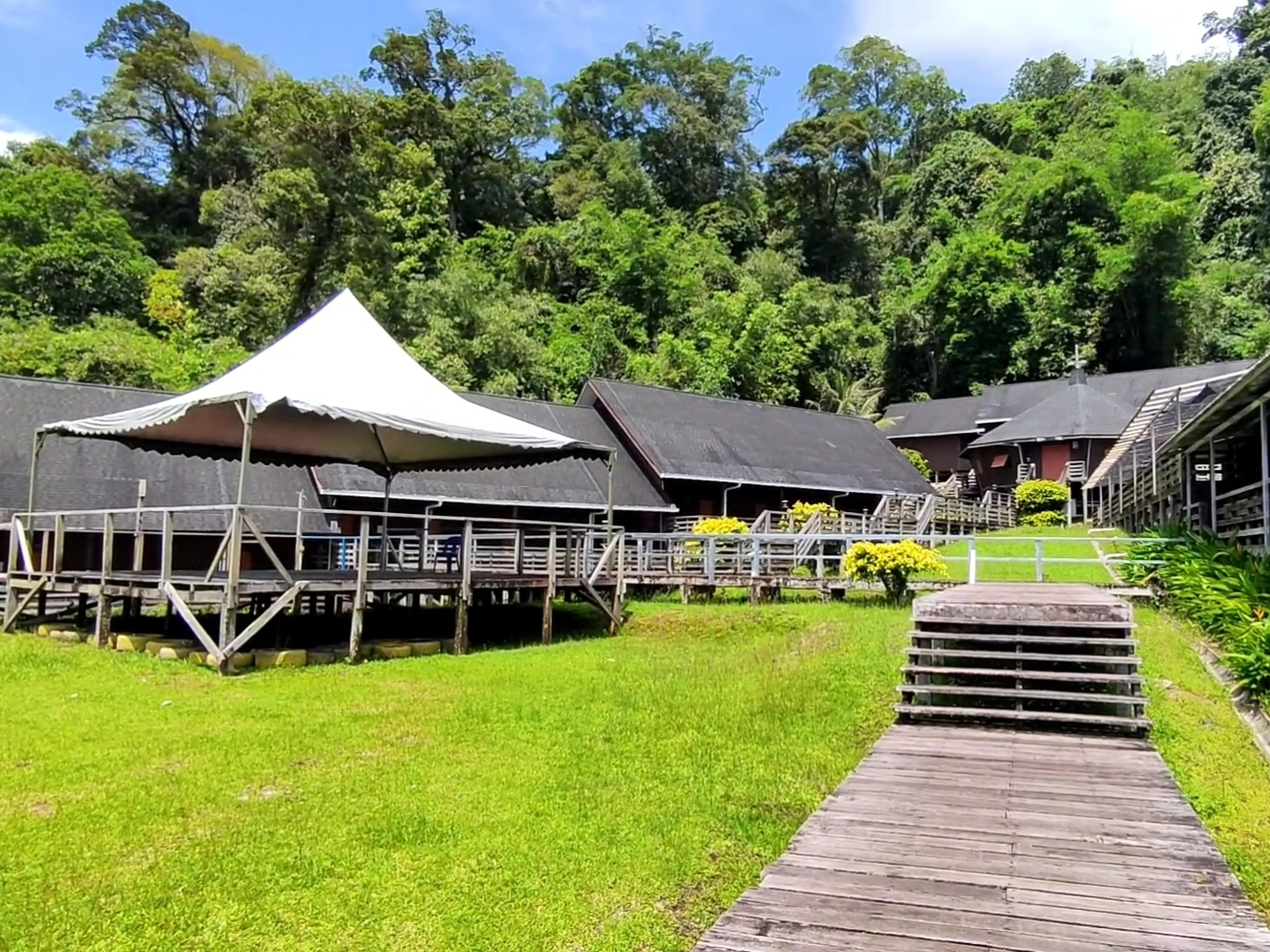
- Bratak Hill overall view (2026)

Highest point
- Elevation: 400 m (1,300 ft)
- Coordinates: 1°28′2″N 110°5′28″E

Naming
- Native name: Bung Bratak (Bau Bidayuh)

Geography
- Country: Malaysia
- State: Sarawak
- Division: Kuching
- District: Bau

Bratak Hill (Bau Bidayuh: Bung Bratak) is a hill located in Bau District, Kuching Division, Sarawak. The hill is located about 39 kilometres (24 mi) from Kuching, the capital of Sarawak.

== History ==
The earliest inhabitants of the hill is the Bidayuh tribes, particularly the Jagoi-Bratak group, as they are believed to be migrating from Mount Sungkong, West Kalimantan, Indonesia. It is believed that the reason for migration among them is to seek for more land for planting paddy fields and to avoid the spreading of infectious diseases.

Around 1838, the Skrang Ibans who aligned to warlord Pengiran Mahkota invaded the Bratak hill area for head hunting. The male inhabitants of the hill were slaughtered, while women and children were enslaved. According to James Brooke's report, from the invasion, the population of Bidayuh who inhabited the hill dwindled from 230 families to 50 families. Under the leadership of Panglima Kulow, with the help of the White Rajah, the settlements of Bratak hill was rebuilt in 1841. After 1841, the people of Bratak hill has emerged to approximately 30 villages in Bau and Lundu districts.

== Bung Bratak Heritage Centre ==
Bung Bratak Heritage Centre (BBHC) was a project initiated by Bung Bratak Heritage Association. The construction of the centre costed MYR8 million which is funded by the Federal Ministry of Tourism and Culture. It is constructed on the top of the hill, which held significant historical value towards the Jagoi-Bratak Bidayuhs.

== Bung Bratak Day ==
Every 1 May, an annual event which is called Bung Bratak Day is held in this hill. The event is celebrated to commemorate the invasion of Skrang Iban in 1838. The declaration of the celebration of this day was first sent to the Dayak Bidayuh National Association in 1988.

On this day, the showcase of Bidayuh culture like traditional dance, music and cuisine will be hosted by the Bidayuh community.

== Gallery ==
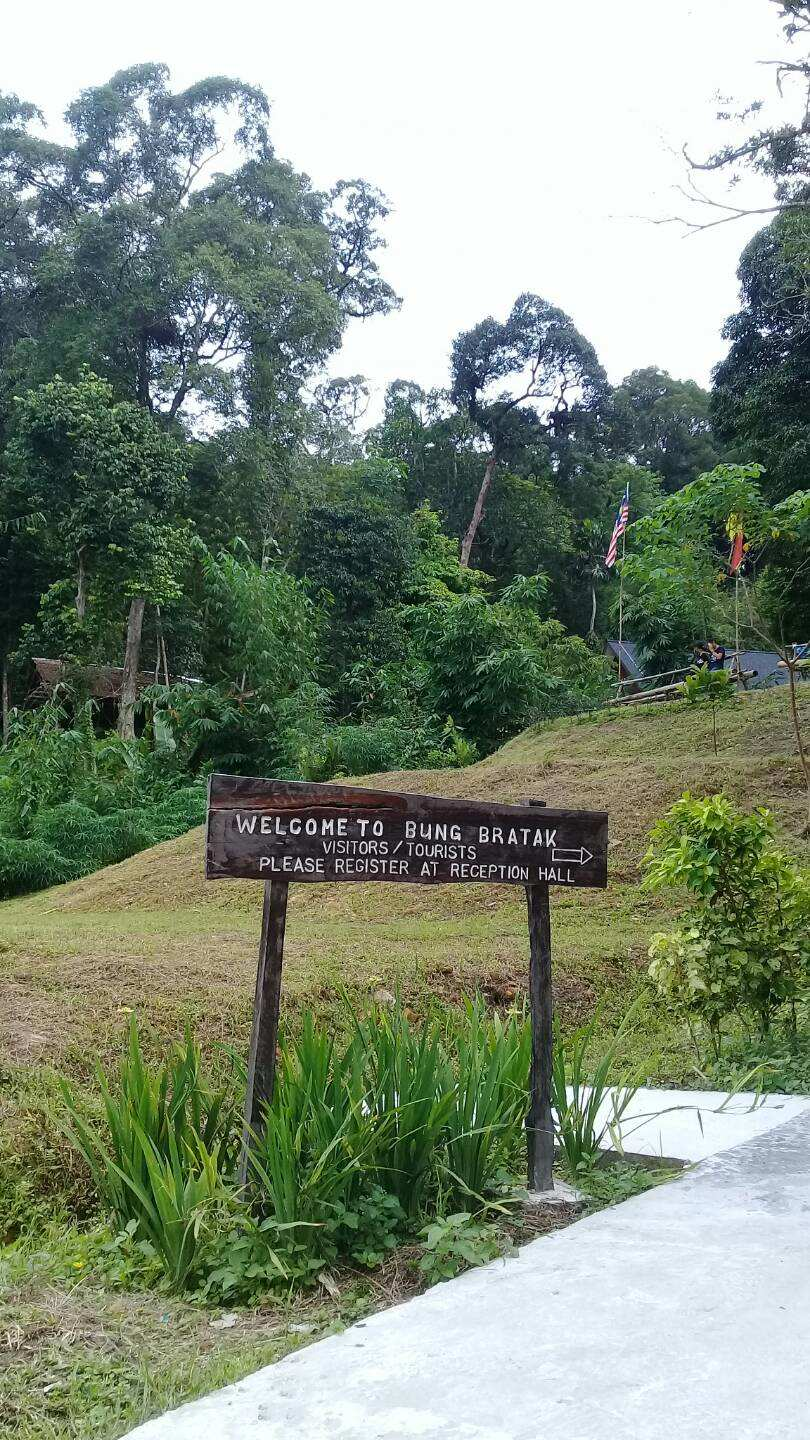
Bung Bratak signboard (2019)

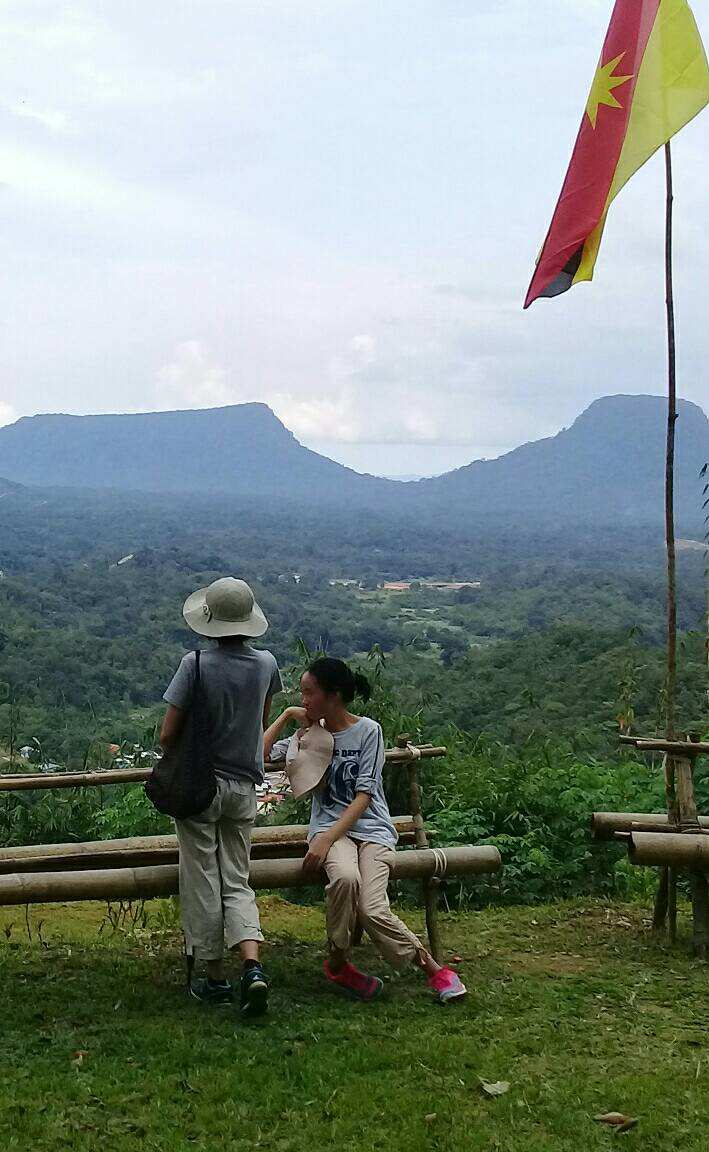
Bung Bratak scenery (2019)

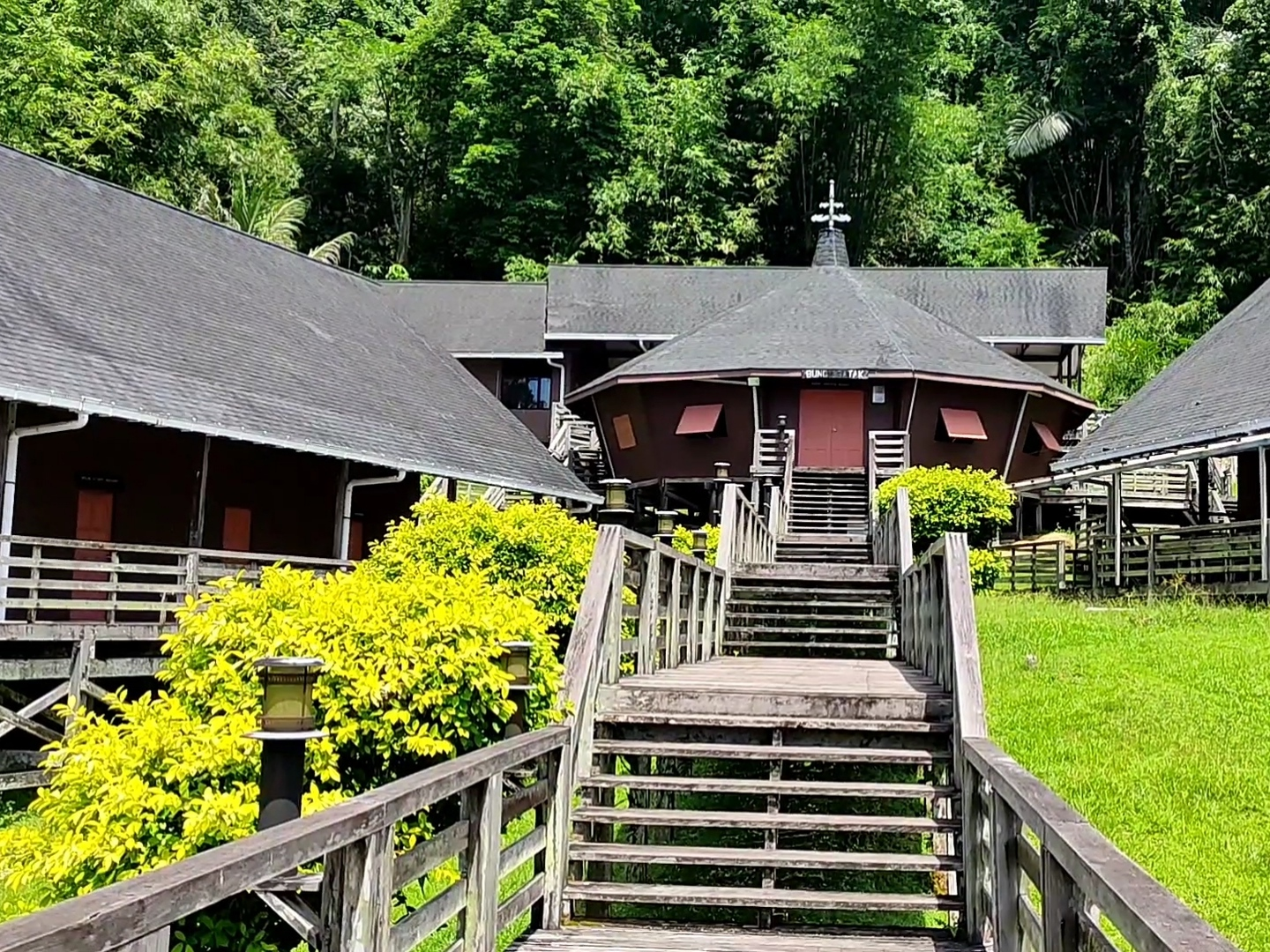
Baruk close-up (2026)

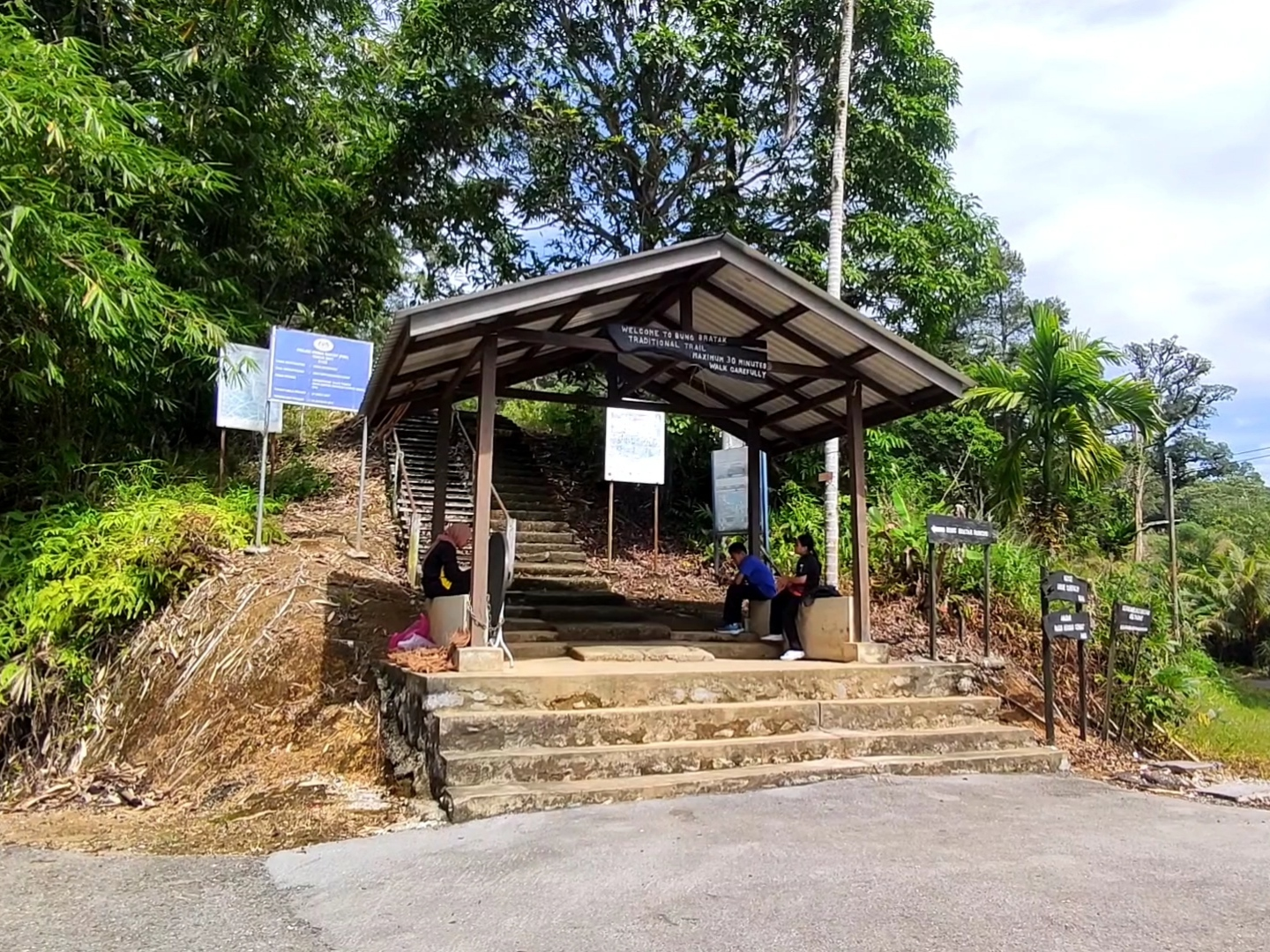
Traditional trail entrance (2026)
