= Tailevu Province =

Province of Fiji

Coordinates: 17°50′S 178°30′E

- Province
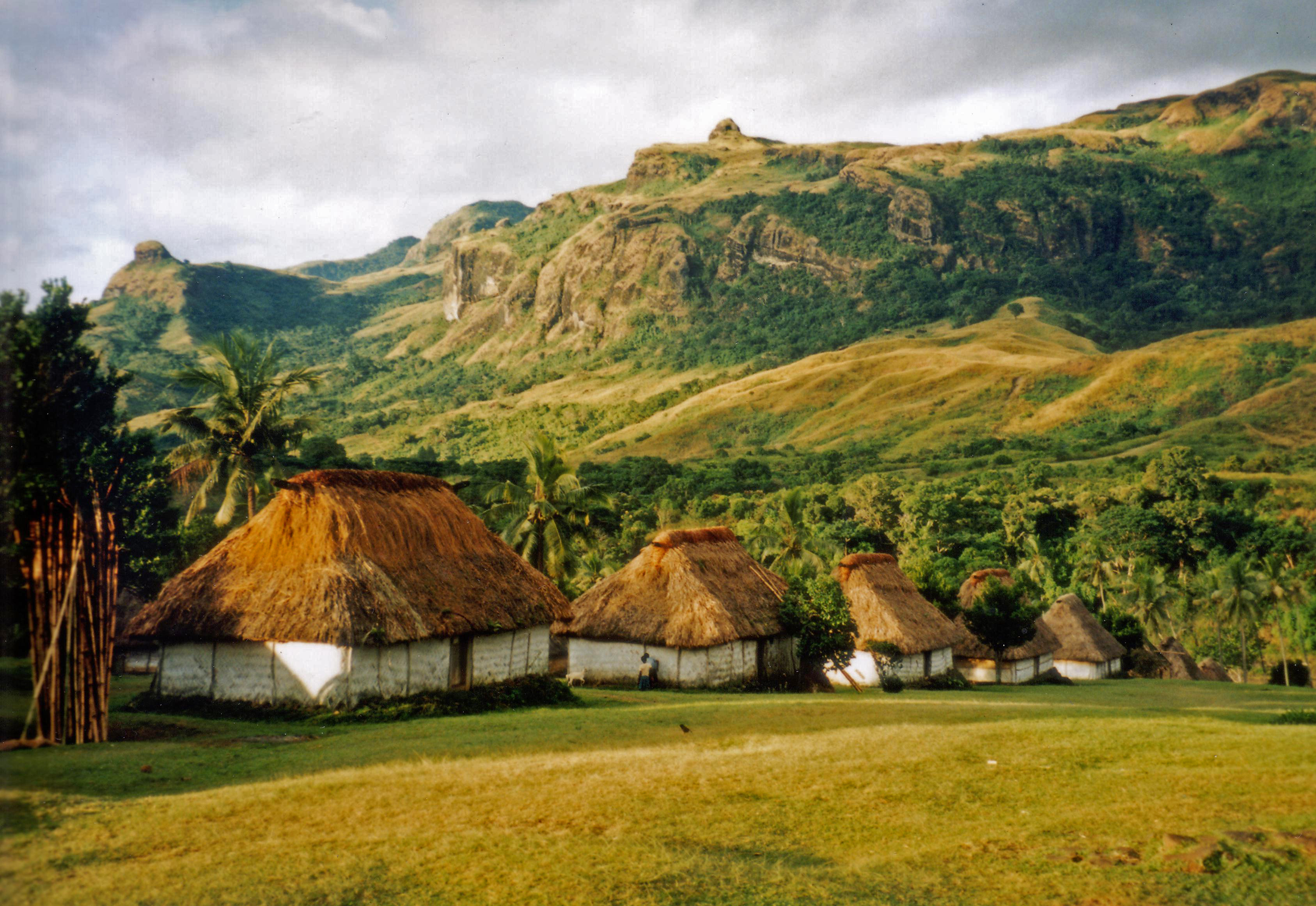
- Village in the Nausori Highlands, 2020
- Interactive map of Tailevu Province
- Country: Fiji
- Division: Central Division

Area
  - Total: 955 km^{2} (369 sq mi)

Population (2017)
  - Total: 64,544
  - Density: 67.6/km^{2} (175/sq mi)

Tailevu is one of the 14 provinces of Fiji. Its main town is Nausori, which lies along the banks of the Rewa River.

== Overview ==
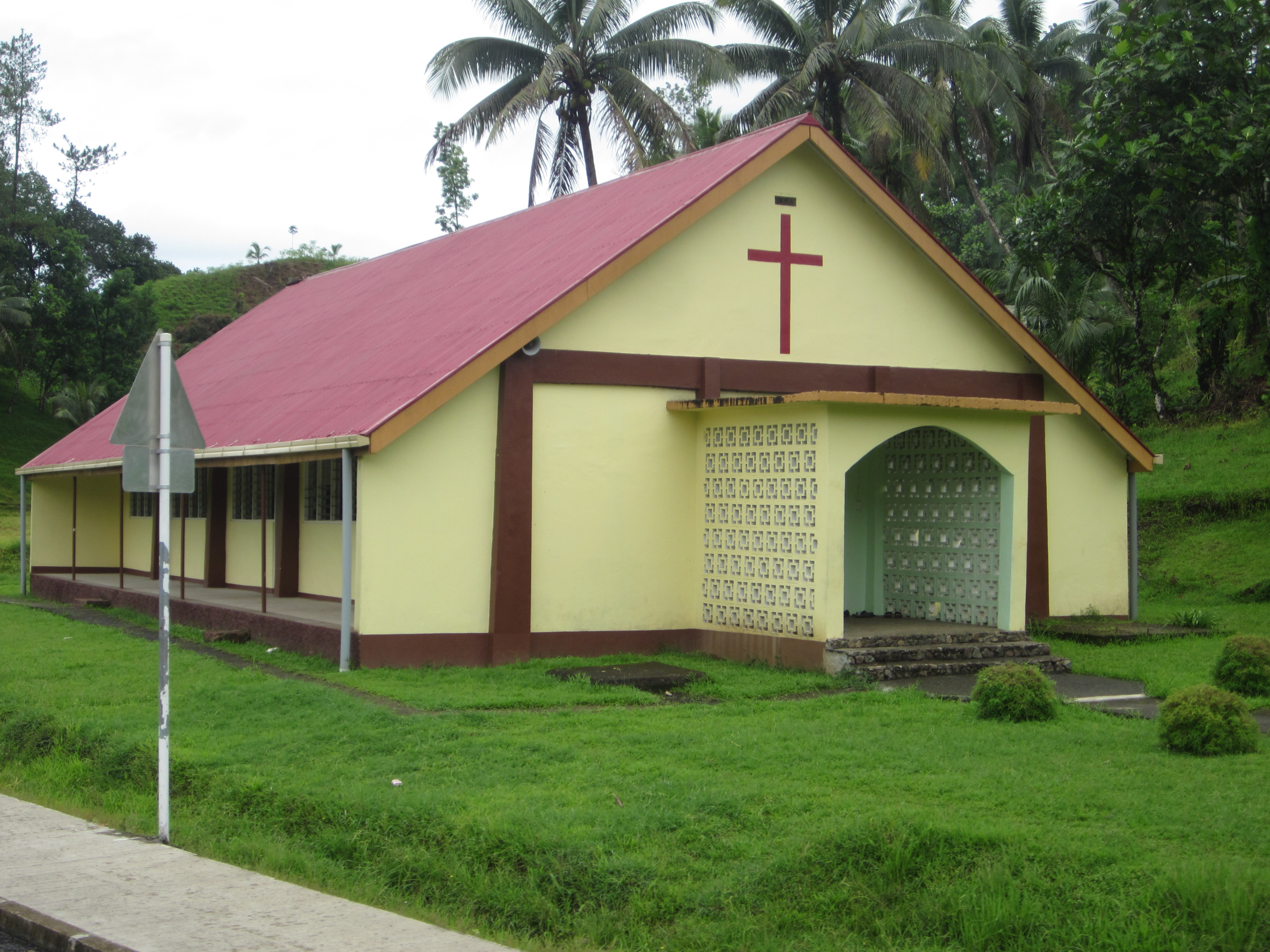
A village church in the Wainibuka District of Tailevu

One of the eight provinces based in Viti Levu, Fiji's largest island, Tailevu's 755 square kilometers occupy the south-eastern fringe of the island along with some central areas. At the 2017 census, it had a population of 64,552, the fifth largest among the provinces.

== Districts ==
Tailevu includes the districts of Bau, Nakelo, Verata, Vugalei, Wainibuka, Dawasamu and Sawakasa. Bau District includes Bau Island, the seat of the Kubuna Confederacy, one of three traditional chiefly hierarchies in Fiji. Kubuna's Paramount Chief, called the Vunivalu of Bau, is generally considered the most senior such chief in Fiji. It also includes the village of Maumi 21 km north-east of Suva, who speak their own dialect, known as Nawakura. The population chose to move from a more remote area in 1977.

== Economy and Transportation ==
The North of Tailevu is the backbone of the Dairy industry in Fiji which helped to establish Rewa Dairy. Also located in the province is the Nausori International Airport, a major transportation hub for domestic and regional travel.

== Demographics ==
Its population at the last census in 2017 was 64,544. The main urban area of Tailevu is Nausori with a population of 24,950.

=== 2017 Census ===
| Tikina (District) | Ethnicity | | | | | | Total |
| Tikina (District) | iTaukei | % | Indo-Fijian | % | Other | % | Total |
|---|---|---|---|---|---|---|---|
| Bau | 18,457 | 59.6 | 11,980 | 38.7 | 528 | 1.7 | 30,965 |
| Nakelo | 9,301 | 85.1 | 1,561 | 14.3 | 68 | 0.6 | 10,930 |
| Sawakasa | 8,223 | 96.0 | 249 | 2.9 | 98 | 1.1 | 8,570 |
| Verata | 9,504 | 91.9 | 777 | 7.5 | 59 | 0.6 | 10,340 |
| Wainibuka | 3,710 | 99.2 | 13 | 0.3 | 16 | 0.4 | 3,739 |
| Province | 49,195 | 61.9 | 14,580 | 34.3 | 769 | 3.8 | 64,544 |

== Notable people ==
- Frank Bainimarama, prime minister of Fiji from 2007 until 2022
- Ratu Seru Epenisa Cakobau, warlord who forged the first nation-state out of the Fiji islands
- Ratu George Cakobau, governor-general of Fiji from 1973 to 1983 and great-grandson of Seru Epenisa Cakobau
- Ratu George Cakobau Jr., politician and son of George Cakobau
- Ratu Jope Seniloli, vice-president of Fiji until 2004
- George Speight, politician who headed the 2000 coup d'état that overthrew Fiji's elected government
