= Arthur Chichester Crookshank =

British administrator in the Raj of Sarawak

Resident of Sarawak
- In office 1863–1873

Personal details
- Born: 23 April 1825 Ryde, Isle of Wight, England
- Died: 15 February 1891 (aged 65)
- Spouse: Bertha Jane Lechmere
- Occupation: Administrator

Arthur Chichester Crookshank (23 April 1825 – 15 February 1891) was a British administrator in the Raj of Sarawak. A cousin of James Brooke, the first White Rajah of Sarawak, he served in a succession of senior administrative posts between 1843 and 1873, including Magistrate, Police Magistrate, Chief Secretary, Resident of Sarawak, and Acting Administrator of the government.

== Early life ==
Crookshank was born at Ryde, Isle of Wight, on 23 April 1825. He entered service in the Honourable East India Company's Marine before joining the administration of Sarawak shortly after the establishment of Brooke rule.

== Career in Sarawak ==
Crookshank was among the earliest European officers of the Brooke administration. He served as Magistrate of Sarawak from 1843 to 1846 and as Police Magistrate from 1846 to 1857. After a brief interval he resumed the latter office from 1860 to 1862.

During the absence of Rajah James Brooke, Crookshank served as Officer Administering the Government from June 1847 until September 1848. He later again exercised executive authority as Administrator from 1869 to 1870.

In 1862 he was appointed Government Secretary and Chief Secretary of the Council Negri, the legislative body of the Raj, serving until 1863. He was subsequently appointed Resident of Sarawak, the highest administrative office under the Rajah after the Chief Secretary, and held that office from 1863 until his retirement in 1873. From 1870 to 1873 he was also a member of the Council Negri. His career spanned three decades of institutional development under both James Brooke and Charles Brooke.

== Family ==
On 23 April 1860, Crookshank married Bertha Jane Lechmere, daughter of the Reverend Allen Whitmore Lechmere of Fownhope Court, Herefordshire, and his wife Maria Cotes. Bertha survived her husband and died on 21 February 1912. The marriage produced no children.

== Death ==
Crookshank died on 15 February 1891 at the age of 65.

== Legacy ==
Crookshank is commemorated by Jalan Crookshank in Kuching, Sarawak. The road is one of several streets in the city named after prominent figures connected with the Brooke administration, including Charles Agar Bampfylde and William Henry Rodway.

== See also ==
- Raj of Sarawak
