= Fairy Cave (Sarawak) =

Cave in Sarawak, Malaysia

- Malay: Gua Pari-Pari
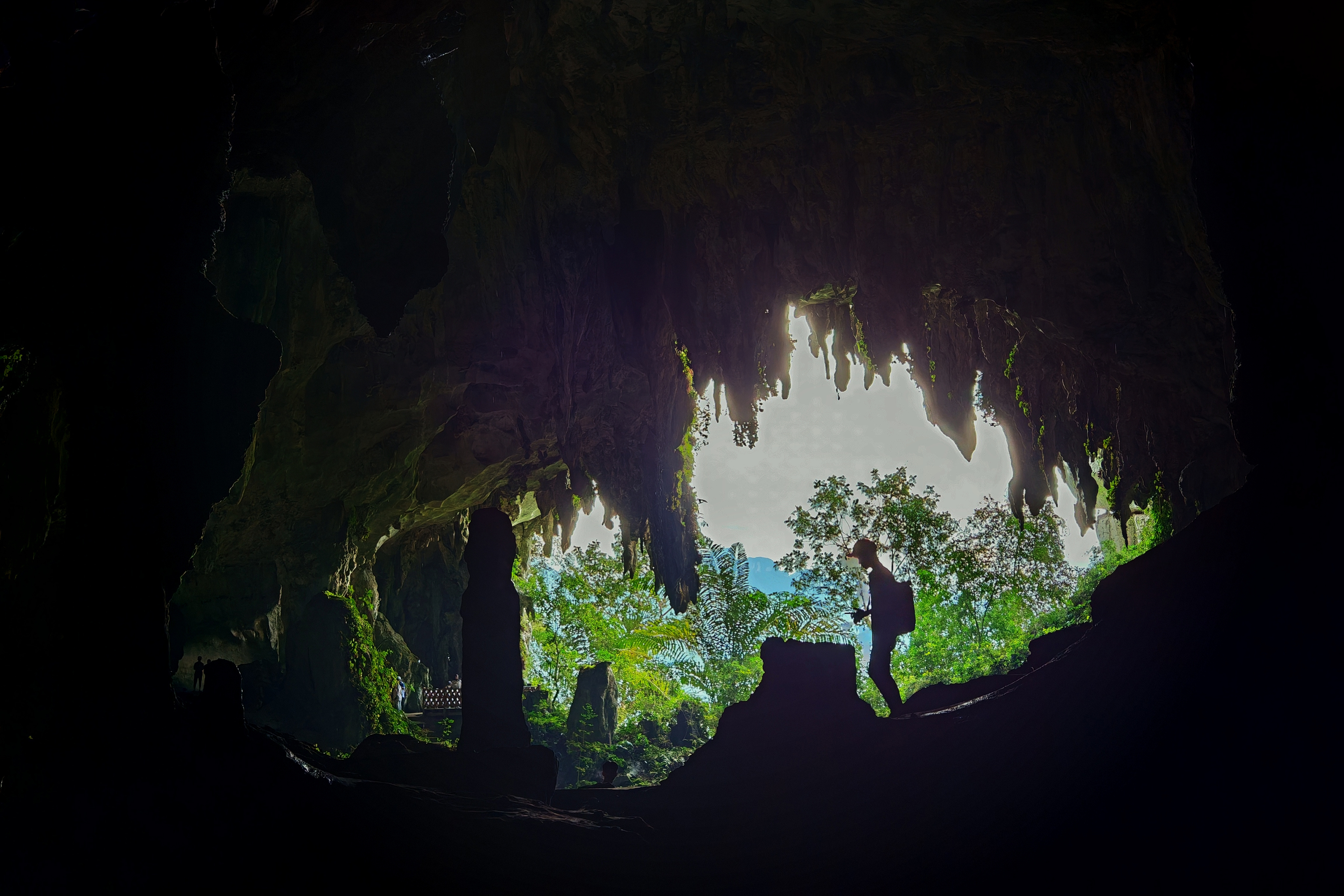
- View of Fairy Cave

- Location within Sarawak
- Location: Bau, Sarawak, Malaysia
- Coordinates: 1°22′55″N 110°07′02″E
- Geology: Limestone

Fairy Cave (Malay: Gua Pari-Pari) is a limestone cave located in Gunung Kapor, a limestone hill in the Bau District, Kuching Division, Sarawak, Malaysia. It is around 30 kilometres (19 mi) from the city of Kuching. It was documented as Kapor Cave until it aroused touristic interest in the 1980's, when it was in religious use by Chinese and sported a small statue of a fairy. This cave has since had several upgrades to improve access and has been gazetted as a nature reserve under the Sarawak Forestry Corporation.

== Formation ==
Fairy Cave is formed in rock of the Bau Limestone Formation which was formed during the Late Jurassic to Early Cretaceous period, dated approximately 163 to 100 million years ago. The creation of this limestone occurred through deposition in a shallow marine setting characterized by warm ocean currents, located far from sources of land-based sediments. This process included the gathering of shells, coral reefs, and pieces of marine organisms, along with the precipitation of calcium carbonate (CaCO_{3}) from seawater, resulting the formation of limestone.. The date of formation of the cave has not been determined, but is likely to much closer to the age legend than that of the surrounding rock.

== Legends ==
One of the legends that is famous among the Bidayuh community is the stalagmites and stalactites inside cave are villagers who had angered the gods and were turned into stone. It is believed that these villagers were being cruel towards the children and especially the orphans. Some version has it that the villagers humiliated a boy during a Gawai celebration and thus resulting them to be punished in the similar way. Some local Chinese believed that the cave is the home of Chinese deities.
