= Pangkalan Tebang =

Coordinates: 1°17′14″N 110°05′22″E

Pangkalan Tebang (Chinese: 新山) is a former gold mining town in the Bau District, Kuching Division of Sarawak, Malaysia.

Gold was mined at Pangkalan Tebang since the early 19th century by Chinese miners.
