= Francis Richardson =

British merchant

Francis Richardson (1815–1896) was a British merchant who worked for trading firms in East Asia and the United Kingdom.

Richardson sailed from Glasgow to Manila in 1837 to join the firm Paterson & Co. They subsequently became McEwen & Co. and moved to Singapore and Java in 1851.

In 1853, Richardson relocated with his firm back to the United Kingdom. He became a director of the Borneo Company on its formation in 1856, progressing to chairman from 1871 until his death in 1896.
