= Frank Richardson (Australian footballer) =

Australian rules footballer

Personal information
- Full name: Francis Brewer Richardson
- Born: 14 November 1897; St Kilda, Victoria
- Died: 11 May 1970 (aged 72); Heidelberg, Victoria
- Original team: Malvern Tramways
- Position: Rover / Wing

Playing career^{1}
Years	Club	Games (Goals)
1925	Melbourne	2 (0)
- ^{1} Playing statistics correct to the end of 1925.

Francis Brewer Richardson (14 November 1897 – 11 May 1970) was an Australian rules footballer who played with Melbourne in the Victorian Football League (VFL).
