= Borneo Company Limited =

One of the oldest companies based in East Malaysia

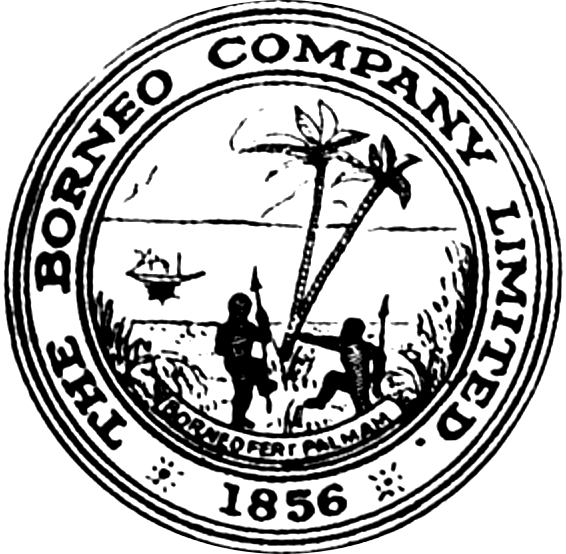
- Type: Public
- Industry: Textiles / Banking / Mining / Coal / Antimony / Gold / Mercury / Sago / Shipping
- Founded: 6 May 1856; 170 years ago
- Headquarters: England, 25 Mincing Lane, London; 1856; 28 Fenchurch Street, London; 1874 until 1956; Mark Lane, London; After 1956; Kunching, Bukit Mata Kuching; Singapore, Borneo Company Wharf
- Divisions: Batavia / Bangkok / Calcutta / Hong Kong / Shanghai
- Subsidiaries: Borneo Agencies / Rejang Transport / United Agencies / Rejang Agencies

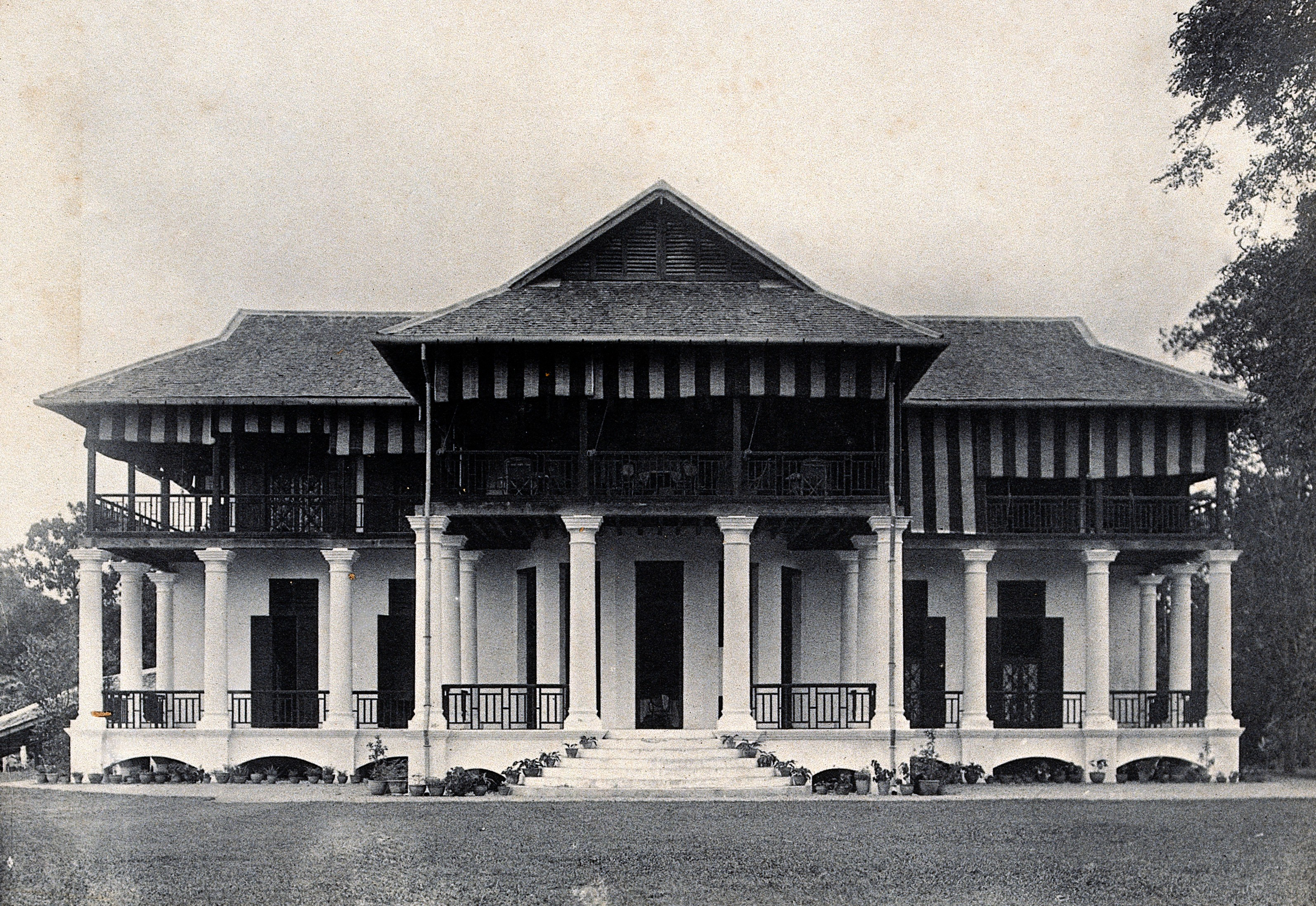
The Kuching Borneo Company building in 1896

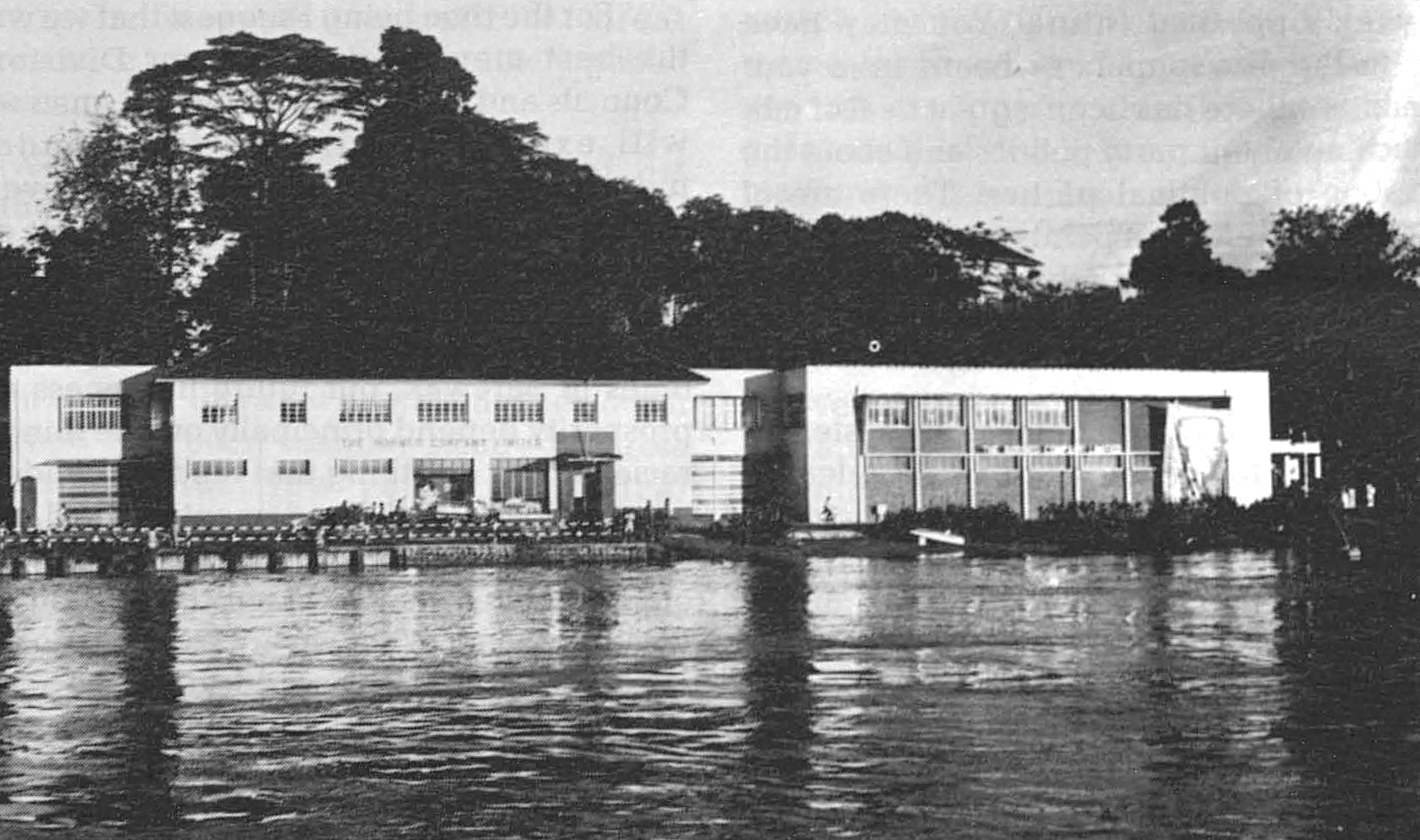
The Borneo Company building in Kuching between 1950 and 1959

Borneo Company Limited, formed in 1856, was one of the oldest companies based in East Malaysia (Sarawak and Sabah).

== History ==
=== Brooke era ===
In 1840s, Henry Wise, then a merchant in London acted as agent for James Brooke (White Rajah of Sarawak). Wise sought to exploit the natural resources of Sarawak (chiefly antimony), but Brooke did not support his plans to set up a company, favouring a geological engineer called Hiram Williams who Wise had wanted to employ as his manager. Wise then became involved in establishing a trading company called the Eastern Archipelago Company (EAC) of which he would be managing director. The company was given a royal charter in 1847 with a monopoly on coal in Labuan and adjacent areas of northern Borneo, using rights granted by Brunei to Brooke as Governor of Labuan. Merchant houses in Britain, such as R&J Henderson agreed to finance the operations of EAC. The company quarreled with government in its Labuan base and quickly proved unsuccessful.

The Hendersons joined others to set up the Borneo Company in London in 1856 to operate largely from Singapore. However, the Hendersens pulled out from EAC before its incorporation.

In 1855, Mr. George Acland established a jute mill for spinning jute yarn at Rishra, West Bengal, India; in 1858 the Borneo Company imported weaving machinery and power loom to be stationed at Baranagar, West Bengal, with George Henderson as its agent. These actions forced the traditional jute cottage industry out of business in India.

The Borneo Company Limited (BCL) was registered in London on 6 May 1856 and MacEwan & Co. was appointed as the company's Singapore agent. The MacEwan company was established in 1852 and was managed by John Harvey. BCL London had taken over the MacEwan Company in 1854. By 30 April 1857, the MacEwan Company was dissolved by BCL. BCL Singapore was established on 31 July 1857 and all the assets from MacEwan Company were transferred to BCL, including wharves in Telok Blangah, Singapore, and its branches in Batavia, Dutch East Indies (today Jakarta, Indonesia) and Bangkok, Thailand. BCL also extended its operations to Calcutta, Hong Kong, and Shanghai. The initial capital of the Borneo Company was £60,000 and the office was at 25 Mincing Lane. Its directors, including some close associates of White Rajah James Brooke, were Robert Henderson (of R.& J.Henderson, Glasgow merchants), John Charles Templer (friend of James Brooke), James Dyce Nicol, John Smith, Francis Richardson, and John Harvey (the latter two of MacEwan & Co. in Singapore).

The company was given exclusive rights to all minerals found in Sarawak, including gold, and the rights to operate as a merchant, ship owner, miner, agriculturist, and planter. In Sarawak, its first manager was Ludvig Verner Helms, who had been a MacEwan & Co trading agent in Sarawak since 1852. Helms was tasked to "buy up the antimony ore, and generally to develop the trade of the country", with a Chinese, an Indian, and a Malay as his initial staff. Helms worked for the company for 20 years. Helms also doubled up his role in the court of law that dealt with civil and criminal cases. Since October 1856, The Borneo Company allocated £200 a year to build an Anglican school in Simunjan District in Sadong area (today part of Samarahan Division). During 1857 Chinese uprising in Bau, BCL employee R Wellington was killed while lodging in police inspector P. Middleton's house. The Sarawak treasury was ransacked, including $6350 belonging to BCL. During the uprising, Helms had ordered arms and supplies from Singapore. The supplies were transported back to Kuching using BCL's schooner named Water Lily. BCL was also instructed to give Rajah an advance payment of £5,000 to repair Rajah's residence, two government houses, and Malays' dwellings that were damaged during the uprising.

By 1859, the company had paid the Brooke government £200,000 in mining royalties. Besides, the company had paid £2 million in wages. The company also requested that the Brooke government return the £5000 advance payment that it gave to Brooke following the 1857 Chinese uprising in Bau, Sarawak. This was because the coal mining venture in Simunjan had failed, the sago trade was disrupted, and there was labour shortage after the 1857 uprising. Thus the company was unable to provide any returns to its investors. The company argued that it is not a "philanthropic society" but a "commercial company". James Brooke then described the company as "discourteous and avaricious". In 1861, after the Bruneian Sultanate ceded the central region of Sarawak (from Samarahan river to Kidurong point in Bintulu) to James Brooke, sago processing and trading restarted in Sarawak. Sago was shipped from growing areas in Mukah for processing in Kuching. Processed sago made up of 68% of total Sarawak exports at this time. Profits from mining ventures were in 1870s were used to upgrade the BCL company buildings and personnel accommodations. In 1875, BCL was appointed as manager for the "Singapore-Sarawak Steamship Company" (S-SSC), where the latter was formed on the advice of the Sarawak Chamber of Commerce to open a trade link with Singapore. With just two ships namely Rajah Brooke and the 2nd Royalist, the company paid 40 to 50% dividends to shareholders for the monopoly sago trade to Singapore. In 1899, BCL's capital increased to £300,000.

In 1905, BCL held the rights to develop oil deposits in Miri. However, after a preliminary survey at the site, BCL decided to forgo the rights because of "too large a commitment" to develop the oil deposits. The rights for oil exploration were later transferred to Anglo-Saxon Oil Company in 1909 (later became a subsidiary of Royal Dutch Shell in the same year).

The economic benefits of mining minerals in Bau and its surroundings started to dry up in the 1920s. BCL also offered rewards to outstation government officers or anyone that can find a new potential mine for development, however, no one was able to find another one. In 1923, there was no longer any economic benefit of extracting minerals in Sarawak. The Borneo Company in London was then forced to relinquish its 1857 agreement.

Initially, all the BCL managers and senior employees were European. Only in the 1950s were local Sarawakians appointed as executives and managers. The company also had branches throughout Sarawak, Sabah, and Brunei.

=== Japanese occupation ===
All of the Borneo Company's activities was halted during the Japanese occupation. The Borneo Company's personnel either escaped from Sarawak or interned at Batu Lintang camp.

=== British Crown Colony ===
After the World War II, the company's Bangkok office in Thailand was reopened on 18 October 1945, two months after the Japanese surrender, followed by the Singapore office on 31 December 1945. Borneo Company's Kuching office in Sarawak was only opened in April 1946, followed by Sibu in June, and Miri in August 1946.

The company was the only agent to distribute oil from Shell Oil Company, operating the first Shell petrol kiosk in Kuching. The Sarawak colonial government also mandated the company to import and distribute consumer goods throughout Sarawak.

The Borneo Company offices in Kuching were on the spot now occupied by the Hilton hotel, with the manager's house, 'Aneberg', on the hill above. It also had warehouses located where Grand Margherita and Wisma Bukit Mata today.

=== Federation of Malaysia ===
The Borneo Company continued its businesses as usual after the formation of Malaysia. At this time, the company was involved in various sectors such as shipping, airline, insurance, forestry, wood processing, and consumer products. The Borneo Company owned three subsidiary shipping companies, namely Borneo Agencies, Rejang Transport, United Agencies, and Rejang Agencies.

In 1967, the company merged with the Inchcape Group headquartered in Singapore. In 1974, the Borneo Company initiated a joint venture with Sarawak Economic Development Corporation (SEDC) to form Sarawak Sebor Sdn Bhd. In 2007, Sarawak Sebor sold all its shareholdings to a company known as IDS/LF Asia. LF (Lee & Fung) Asia was a global supply chain company headquartered in Hong Kong. In 2016, LF Asia sold its interests to another China based company known as DCH (Dah Chong Hong Holdings Ltd). On 28 September 2018, DCH decided to cease all remaining operations of the Borneo Company.

== Corporate affairs ==
Helms left Sarawak on 30 May 1872. Helms helped to produce the second map of Sarawak Proper (today Kuching area) during his term as the manager of BCL. Helms later returned to Sarawak in 1894 to help BCL on mineral prospecting at Tubau (at Sebauh, Sarawak) but returned empty handed. Walter G. Brodie, who was involved in the BCL's mining operation succeeded Helms from 1872 to 1885. Brodie was succeeded by Cadell from 1885 to 1891. Cadell was in turn succeeded by E. J. M. Smith from 1891 to 1899.

== Businesses ==
=== Banking ===
The Brooke government made monetary transactions through agents in Singapore and London prior to the formation of the Borneo Company (BCL). After that, the Borneo Company became the sole government banker from 1856 to 1912. All government transactions were routed through BCL head office at 28 Fenchurch Street in London. Besides, the company also provided banking services for the public, using Sarawak dollar as the medium of exchange. People had also approached the company for loans to collect forest produce, build boats, and carry out trading activities. The Dayak people also accumulated enough cash by selling forest produce during economic boom times and started to provide loans to Chinese traders. To protect the interests of the Dayak people, Rajah Charles Brooke issued an order dated 27 June 1885, stating that all loans should be registered with BCL or otherwise heavy penalties will be instituted.

Later, Sarawak Chinese developed their own financing and credit facilities that linked back to Singapore. In 1905, Cantonese-managed Kwong Lee Mortgage & Remittance Company was formed, ending the dominance of BCL banking businesses in Sarawak. In 1912, the Brooke government also set up Sarawak State Advisory Council in London, taking over some of the government's money remittance functions from BCL. In 1925, Charles Vyner Brooke invited London-based Chartered Bank of India, Australia and China to open a branch in Kuching. BCL later agreed not to open new accounts, while the company continued to provide service to existing customers, mainly consisting of Dayaks, who would sometimes come downriver to the office to see their money. However, the company did not extend its credit facilities to its own employees.

=== Mining ===
BCL was given a monopoly for mineral extractions in Sarawak in 1857. Mining of minerals enabled BCL to achieve a profit for the first time in 1898, 42 years after its formation. When the company dropped its mining rights in 1923 as the mining profits dried up, basic communication systems between Bau and Kuching such as telegraphy and telephony had been developed by the company. Other facilities such as mule tracks, tramways, and footbridges connecting mine sites and processing centers; a wharf at Buso and a hospital in Bau were also built. The Malays and Chinese later started to apply for mining leases and extract the remaining valuable materials from the tailings left by the BCL at gold mines. This had caused gold exports to rise to a peak of 29,380 oz in 1934, although at a much lower output when compared to the gold exports by BCL in previous years (40,000 to 68,108 Oz).

==== Coal ====
In 1857, the company hired five coal miners from England to work in Sadong coal mine together with Chinese labourers, located at the base of the 322-metre-high Gunong Ngili (Ngili hill) in Simunjan District, three kilometres away from Sadong river. On 1 April 1858, a short railway was built connecting the coal mine to the Sadong river. Buffaloes were used to pull carts of coal to the river. The coal was then transported to Singapore on a brig or steamship. Introduction of longwall mining method allowed increase in coal production. However, the coal seams were thin, which measures 45 to 60 cm in thickness, making it unprofitable to mine. Accidents occurred in 1858 where a falling stone killed a Chinese miner and an Indian buffalo driver lost his arm after falling down in front of a wagon filled with ore. BCL incurred a loss of £20,000 and closed the mine, depriving the Brooke government of payment of £1,000 from BCL on exclusive rights for coal extraction. Undeterred by the mishap, the Brooke government reopened the mine with assistance from BCL in terms of marketing and management. The Brooke government offered to sell 300 tons of coal to Peninsular & Oriental (P & O) Steam Navigation Company in Singapore by June 1874 but only able to supply 150 tons by September 1874. Mine manager W. G. Brodie predicted that the Brooke government would have difficulty supplying the remaining 150 tons of coal to the P&O Steam Navigation Company and would suffer heavy losses. However, the Simunjan mine continued to operate until January 1932.

==== Antimony ====
Antimony deposits were readily found in Bau District, especially in Buso, Bidi West, and East Mines, along the tributaries of the Sarawak River. Exporting 1,500 tons of antimony a year, Sarawak was the chief supplier of antimony to Europe through Singapore. In the year ending 31 October 1857, BCL had earned $11,935 from the antimony trade. After deducting $3,750 royalty paid to the Brooke government, the net profit for BCL was $8,365, which was 70 percent of BCL income for that year. Initially, Chinese workers were hired to carry baskets of antimony ores on their shoulders to the river. Later in 1858, BCL hired miners from England to build tramway track made up of Belian wood (Eusideroxylon) with wagons drawn by buffaloes. During fine weather, water was kept out of the mines by pulling buckets attached to huge posts and beams. During the rainy season, all mining activities had to be stopped due to rapidly rising water levels. English miners had commented that "a little donkey engine" would have done a better job of pumping out water from the mines. Several Chinese miners had died due to infectious diseases. English miners did not spare from such diseases and had to return to England later. Two Bidi mines were shut down later after digging 28 and 46 metres respectively. BCL also built reverberatory and calcining furnaces (smelter) in Busau to extract antimony sulphide ores. BCL also produced a patent in 1864 that used antimony for the production of paint, however, no evidence of such paint has been produced in the market. The most productive antimony mines were: Busau, Jambusan, Piat Flats, and Bidi mines. Antimony output rose to 3,285 tons in 1872. In 1874, BCL paid £2,000 a year for the sole right to mine antimony in Sarawak. However, minable antimony ores in Bau district were rapidly declining. In 1890s, antimony exports were negligible. Antimony stockpiles in the company were exhausted in 1907 and the smelter in Busau was shut down. BCL relinquished its mining rights in 1923.

==== Mercury ====
BCL discovered the mercury ore (Cinnabar or mercuric sulphide) at the foot of the 250-metre tall Tegora hill, in the Bungo Range, 20-kilometre south of Busau, Bau District in September 1867. BCL cleared a bridle path and built 48 footbridges from Jambusan to Gunung Tegora after that. Chinese contract miners were tasked to remove clay from the Western side of Tegora by sluicing and washing. The ores obtained yield 40 to 60% pure mercury. Ore exports to London totaled 25 tons in 1868 and 123 tons in 1869. A plant to extract mercury was built by 1870. In the same year, BCL hired about 1,000 Chinese workers and a number of Dayaks. BCL offices and a hospital was also built there. Horse-drawn rail wagons were used to transport ores to the plant. A total of 732 iron flasks each containing 75 lbs was exported in that same year, valuing $22,692. By 1872, 1,505 mercury flasks were exported with a value of $86,353. BCL also tried to explore Gunung Gading (in Lundu District today), seven kilometres away from Gunung Tegora for mercury ore deposits but without success due to the lower quality of ores available there. Workers at the mercury mining sites experienced several hazards such as the risk of injury from falling rocks or landslides, and mercury poisoning that causes loss of teeth and body sores. By 1875, a total of 2,500 lbs. (1,114 kg.) of gunpowder was used to detonate the Tengora hill, leaving honeycomb-like tunnels within the hill. BCL subsequently closed down the mine in 1921. By this time, a total of 10,608 iron flasks each containing 75 lbs. (34 kg.) of mercury were produced, at a total value of £228,000. BCL abandoned the plant and equipment where the majority of them were sent to Kuching with the exception of one boiler sent to BCL's sawmill in Bangkok.

==== Gold ====
After the 1857 Chinese uprising in Bau, Rajah James Brooke invited Liew Syn Ted and his group of gold miners to revive the gold mining industry in Bau. Later self-employed miners and Kongsi (Chinese cooperatives) were attracted to the area. A new bazaar was built in Bau, replacing "Mah San" town that was burnt down during the uprising. BCL provided credits, lent mining equipment, and purchase gold from miners for export instead of being involved directly in mining business. However, the growing influence of BCL in gold mining led Soon Hen Kongsi to later work on a contract basis with BCL. In March 1879, BCL was given 15 years of gold prospecting monopoly. In 1882, the company commissioned a small ore-crushing plant in Bau, replacing manual labour in ore-crushing. Silver ore were also produced during gold mining but the silver ores were exhausted quickly. As the gold mining started to expand, the Brooke government started to ban the trading of dynamite and to be used exclusively for mining purposes.

BCL also worked with other Chinese Kongsis such as Tai Parit Kongsi and Shak Lung Mun Kongsi. However, some conflicts do happen such as Shak Lung Mun diverting water away from flowing to the BCL's mining operations despite being only allowed to "use the water from the reservoir but not diverting away". By 1897, BCL bought last of the Chinese Kongsis and gained complete control of gold mining in Bau. Initially, simple methods of gold panning and sluice were used to recover coarse gold particles from the river bed. BCL later turned to the recovery of fine gold particles by suspending the crushed ore in cyanide solution after the method was first used in South Africa in 1890. BCL started to experiment with gold cyanidation in 1896. Bau gold processing plant was finally opened in 1898 after significant adaptations of the cyanidation technique from South Africa. In 1908, BCL switched to a new all-sliming processing plant that uses filter presses separating gold-bearing cyanide solution from fine-crushed ore to increase the efficiency of gold cyanidation.

In 1883, gold ore was discovered in "Grey Ridge" (or "Tai Parit") in Bau district. Tai Parit later became a large open-pit mining operation by 1913. By 1919, the Tai Parit site was excavated 200 feet, with increasingly unstable geology, threatened by monsoon rains and landslides. Cracks also seen along the excavation site. By 1921, BCL ceased all gold mining operations at Tai Parit. The Tai Parit mine was renamed as "Tasik Biru" in the 1970s after it became a popular picnic venue. BCL also opened a gold mine at Tai Ton and a total of 4,969 tons of low-grade ores were produced. By August 1920, all the ores produced from Tai Ton were written off as "useless".

In 1900, another ore processing plant in Bidi (in Bau district) was built. However, gold ore sources for Bidi plant were widely scattered, from as far as four miles away at Jagoi mountains near the Dutch Borneo. Besides, the ores supplying the Bidi plant were of lower quality. Subsequently, gold production at Bidi plant was insufficient to cover its operation costs; and the plant closed down in 1911 after producing a total of 185,351 ounces of gold.

BCL tried to extract ore body sticking out from the foot of the limestone hills at Jambusan, seven kilometres away from the town of Bau, but was unsuccessful.

Gold exports from Sarawak rose rapidly from 1898 (984 oz) to a peak in 1907 (68,108 oz). After the conversion of Bau processing plant to an all-sliming plant in 1908 and the closure of Bidi plant in 1911, gold exports were reduced to 40,000 oz per year. In 1922, the Bau processing plant ceased operation and dismantling works were started. The Sarawak government bought two boilers with steam engines and 250 kW generators from the Bau processing plant for $60,000 and was later commissioned as a power station in Kuching on 15 June 1923.

=== Sago ===
By 1857, the sago trade was the second most important trade for BCL after antimony, earning a profit of £2,752 from sago, sago flour, and vegetable tallow sago. The profit from the antimony trade at that time was £8,365. BCL sourced its raw sago materials from Mukah, which was still under Brunei's control. In 1859, Sarawak traders were not allowed to enter Mukah. Tuan Muda Charles Brooke opined that Syarif Masahor, the governor of Brunei of that area needs to be expelled in order to resume trade with Mukah. Rajah James Brooke then sailed to Mukah on armed flotilla. On 11 August 1861, the Sultan of Brunei agreed to resume trade with Sarawak and cede the area from Samarahan River (near Kota Samarahan today) to Kidurong point in (near Bintulu today) to Sarawak in return for $4,500 annual payment. A branch office of BCL was opened in Mukah later. A sago processing factory began commercial operation in May 1862. However, in early 1900s, with the drop in Sago prices and increased competition from Chinese sago mills, BCL closed down its Mukah sago factory, leaving behind a 20-metre tall brickwork chimney in there.
