= Dog Hole Cave =

Archaeological site in England

Dog Hole
- Haverbrack Bank Pot
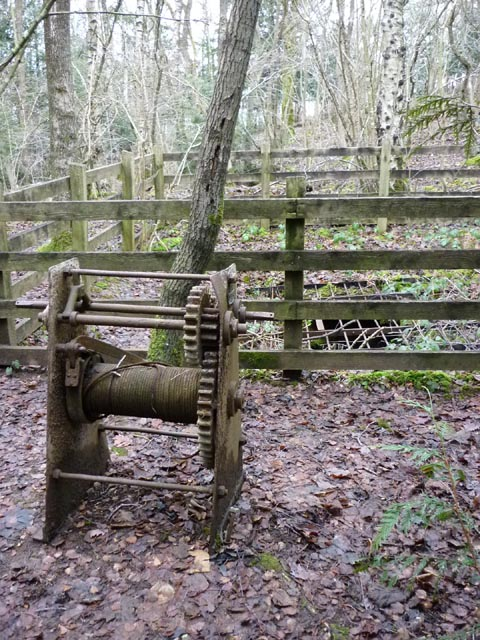
- The cave entrance in January 2010

- Location within Cumbria
- Location: Storth, Cumbria, England
- OS grid: SD 4826 8019
- Coordinates: 54°12′54″N 2°47′39″W
- Depth: 12 metres (39 ft)
- Length: 6 metres (20 ft)
- Elevation: 60 metres (200 ft)
- Geology: Carboniferous limestone
- Entrances: 1
- Difficulty: II

Dog Hole Cave is an archaeologically significant cave near Storth, Cumbria, England.

== Description ==
Other names for the cave include Haverbrack Bank Pot, Haverbrack Dog Hole, Fairy Cave, The Dog Hole, and Doghole Cave.

It consists of a largely excavated 12 metres (39 ft) shaft formed in Carboniferous Limestone with 6 metres (20 ft) of steeply dipping phreatic tube at the bottom.

== History ==
It was originally excavated by J. W. ("Wilfred") Jackson in 1912. Further excavation was carried out by local scouts in the 1950s, and by researchers from Liverpool John Moores University in 2003, and in 2009 it was reported that "subsequent renewed caving activity has revealed more archaeology". Jackson found domestic animal bones (dogs, pigs) some of which are in the Natural History Museum, and the scouts also found human bones. The cave was gated in the 1980s to protect the archaeology, but inspection in 2003 showed that this had been destroyed.

Radiocarbon dating of the deposits has provided dates ranging from Romano-British to Early Medieval.
