= Bau District =

District of Tailevu Province, Fiji

Coordinates: 17°58′21.22″S 178°36′55.35″E

Bau District is a district of Tailevu Province, Fiji. According to the 2017 census, the district had a population of 30,965 inhabitants.

It is coextensive with Bau Island, the traditional fiefdom of the Vunivalu of Bau, generally considered the most senior chiefly title in Fiji. The tikina makawa of Bau consists of Bau, Dravo, Namara, Namata, and, partly, Nausori.
