= Bau District, Sarawak =

Bau
- District
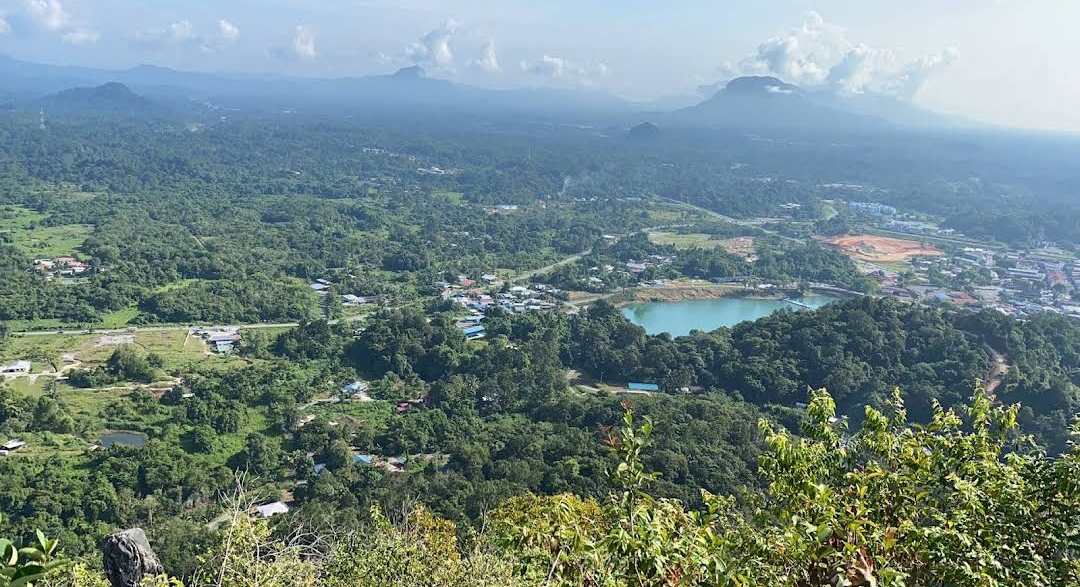
- Aerial view of Bau District. Centre of the image is the town of Bau and Tasik Biru.

- Location within Sarawak Location within Malaysia
- Coordinates: 1°25′0″N 110°0′9″E
- Country: Malaysia
- State: Sarawak
- Seat: Bau

Map of Bau District

Bau is a district, in Kuching Division, Sarawak, Malaysia. Its seat is the town of Bau.

== Geography ==
Gold deposits in Bau Township occur in the Jugan Hills in marine sedimentary rocks of late Jurassic to early Cretaceous age, primarily limestone. The gold comes from hydrothermal sources activated by local volcanism. It is found in four distinct configurations: disseminated throughout the mineralized sediments; as silica replacement; in breccias having magno-calcite quartz veining; and occasionally as porphyritic skarns.

The limestone cliffs in the area support a wide range of endemic flora, including the rare pitcher plant Nepenthes northiana.

== Towns and villages ==
=== Bau ===
The town of Bau houses the seat of Bau District council.

=== Siniawan ===
Siniawan started night market business in 2010.

=== Paku ===
Facilities at Paku hot springs was renovated in 2021.

=== Taiton ===
The Taiton area has range of mountains, caves, lakes and temples.

== List of attractions ==
=== 1. Pekan Bau (Bau Town) ===
- Tasik Biru (Blue Lake), Bau
- ROXY Tasik Biru Resort City, Bau
- Bau Bicentennial Bridge (Tasik Biru Suspension Bridge), Bau
- Tasik Biru Food Village, Bau
- Tasik Biru Tua Pek Kong Temple, Bau
- Gua Hantu (Ghost Cave), Bau
- Bau Recreation Park (Taman Rekreasi Pekan Bau)
- Bau Landmark, Pekan Bau
- Dataran Bau (Bau Town Square)
- Rock Garden Bau
- Dewan Suarah Bau
- St. Stephen Catholic Church, Bau
- Masjid Daerah Bau
- Zhi Yin Chi Kwan Yin Temple, Bau
- Bidayuh Cultural Centre (Pusat Kebudayaan Bidayuh), Pekan Bau
- Bau Sports Arena, Jambusan, Bau
- Ming Ming Food Junction, Bau
- Bau Golden Square
- Sigon Dorod Cafe (Kampung Skiat Lama, Bau)
- Mount Krian National Park (also known as Taman Negara Gunung Krian), Bau
- Dorod Posih Cave (Gua Dorod Posih), Bau
- Libiki Bamboo Resort, Bau
- Abba Paradise Resort, Bau
- Sungai Puak (Puak River), Seropak, Bau
- Sungai Puak Red Bridge, Seropak, Bau
- Paku Rock Maze Garden, Bau
- Paku Town (Pekan Paku), Bau
- Air Panas Paku (Paku Hot Spring)

=== 2. Siniawan (Siniawan Town) ===
- Serembu Extreme Park (Taman Ekstrem Serembu), Bau
- Siniawan Night Market (Pasar Malam Pekan Siniawan), Siniawan
- Siniawan Waterfront (Tebingan Siniawan)
- Siniawan Waterfront Bridge (new attraction)
- Boli Asuh Siniawan
- Swee Guk Kung Temple, Siniawan
- ROXY Hotel Siniawan
- Premier Food Republic (Siniawan, Bau)
- Serembu Eco Park, Siniawan
- Bung Muan Heritage Centre (James Brooke Heritage)
- Bung Muan (Gunung Serembu)

== Demographics ==
Bidayuh is the majority ethnic in Bau with 50.1% of total population, followed by Chinese (19%), Malays (14%), and Iban (9.2%).

Ethnic groups in Bau, Sarawak (2025)
Ethnics	Percent
Malays	14%
Chinese	19%
Iban	9.2%
Bidayuh	50.1%
Orang Ulu	2%
Melanau	5.3%
Indian	0.1%
Non-citizens	0.3%

Here is total population based on every sub-areas inside the Bau District area :

1. Pekan Bau (Bau Town)

- Bidayuh : 23,308
- Chinese : 12,736
- Malay : 5,144
- Iban : 1,501
- Melanau : 200
- Indian : 29
- Orang Ulu : –
- Other ethnics : –

TOTAL : 42,918

2. Opar & Sibuluh

- Bidayuh : 6,142
- Iban : 513
- Malay : 90
- Chinese : 40
- Orang Ulu : –
- Melanau : –
- Indian : –
- Other ethnics : –

TOTAL : 6,785

3. Tondong, Singai, & Buso

- Bidayuh : 16,915
- Malay : 5,819
- Chinese : 4,300
- Iban : 461
- Orang Ulu : 20
- Melanau : –
- Indian : –
- Other ethnics : –

TOTAL : 27,515

4. Serikin

- Bidayuh : 10,681
- Chinese : 2,320
- Malay : 840
- Iban : 107
- Orang Ulu : –
- Melanau : –
- Indian : –
- Other ethnics : –

TOTAL : 13,948

5. Siniawan, Musi, & Keranji

- Chinese : 19,546
- Bidayuh : 8,463
- Malay : 8,091
- Iban : 215
- Melanau : 79
- Orang Ulu : –
- Indian : –
- Other ethnics : –

TOTAL : 36,394
