= Ludvig Verner Helms =

Danish merchant and author

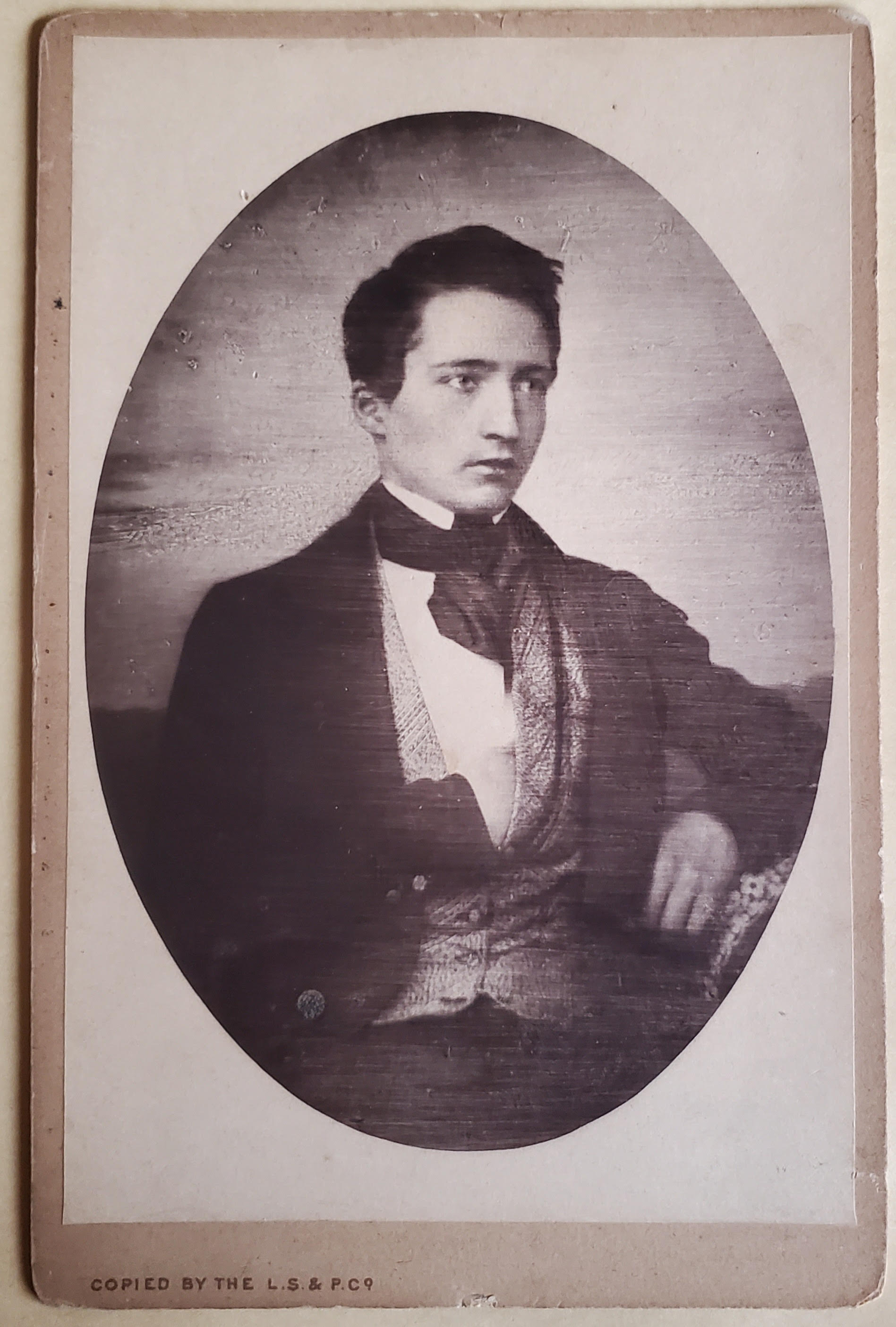
- Ludvig Verner Helms in 1846
- Born: April 14, 1825; Varde, Denmark
- Died: July 26, 1918 (aged 93); Hampstead, England
- Occupations: Merchant, emissary, and author
- Employer: The Borneo Company Limited
- Notable work: Pioneering in the Far East, with Journeys to California in 1849 and the White Sea in 1878 (1882)
- Spouse: Anne Amelia Bruce
- Children: Eve Louisa Mathilda, Dora Helen, Dagmar, Hilda Constance, Katharine Annie, Mary Sibyl, Vera Ewen, Vera, Harold Verner Bruce, Paul Victor
- Parent(s): Rudolph Helms and Mathilde Augusta Fridsch

Ludvig Verner Helms (April 14, 1825 – July 26, 1918) was an adventurer, merchant, emissary, and author associated with South-east Asia, especially the Borneo Company in Sarawak. As a manager for the Borneo Company for twenty years, he developed and expanded trade for Sarawak in the country's infancy. He traveled extensively and encountered several notable personalities including Mads Lange, the kings of Cambodia and Siam, the White Rajahs of Sarawak, Alfred Russel Wallace, and Brigham Young. Helms wrote and illustrated an account of his adventures in 1882 titled Pioneering in the Far East and Journeys to California in 1849 and to the White Sea in 1878, providing firsthand accounts of Bali, California, Cambodia, Thailand, Sarawak, Japan, the White Sea, and their leaders during periods of significant historical interest.

== Early life ==
Ludvig Verner Helms was born in Varde, Denmark, on April 14, 1825, the son of Rudolph Helms and his second wife Mathilde Augusta Fridsch. Rudolph Helms was an apoteker (pharmacist) in Varde. Ludvig was the thirteenth of sixteen children.

== Southeast Asia (1847–1872) ==
In 1846 Helms left for Bali, sailing via the Cape and Singapore. He spent the next 26 years in Southeast Asia working as a merchant or trader. During this period he would visit Bali, Cambodia, Siam, China, Japan, Australia, and California.

=== Bali ===
Helms sailed from Hamburg, Germany, on the Brig Johanna Caesar on September 15, 1846, with the intention of finding and introducing himself to his fellow countryman Mads Lange, who was reputed to have established a successful merchant business on the island of Bali. He had never met or corresponded with Lange, but had letters of introduction. His ship stopped in Cape Town, South Africa, in November 1846, where he spent several weeks with friends, and then continued to Singapore on December 16, 1846, where he arrived on February 25, 1847.

In Singapore he was told the Bali natives were unfriendly and was advised against proceeding. However, he decided to continue, and found a ship that was willing to drop him off at Bali. He arrived in the middle of the night and, communicating only by repeating Lange's name, was led by natives to Lange's residence, where he was welcomed.

Helms spent the next two years working for Lange in his growing trade business near Kuta, which included rice, spices, and animal stock, as well as the importing of the Chinese kepeng, the currency used in Bali. His responsibilities included negotiating prices, and arranging and preparing cargo for shipment. While in Bali, he became well acquainted with the natives and their habits and religions, later extensively documenting them in his book Pioneering in the Far East. Along with Lange, Helms also met and occasionally interacted with the reigning rajahs of Bali, particularly Rajah Kassiman (Kesiman) of Badung.

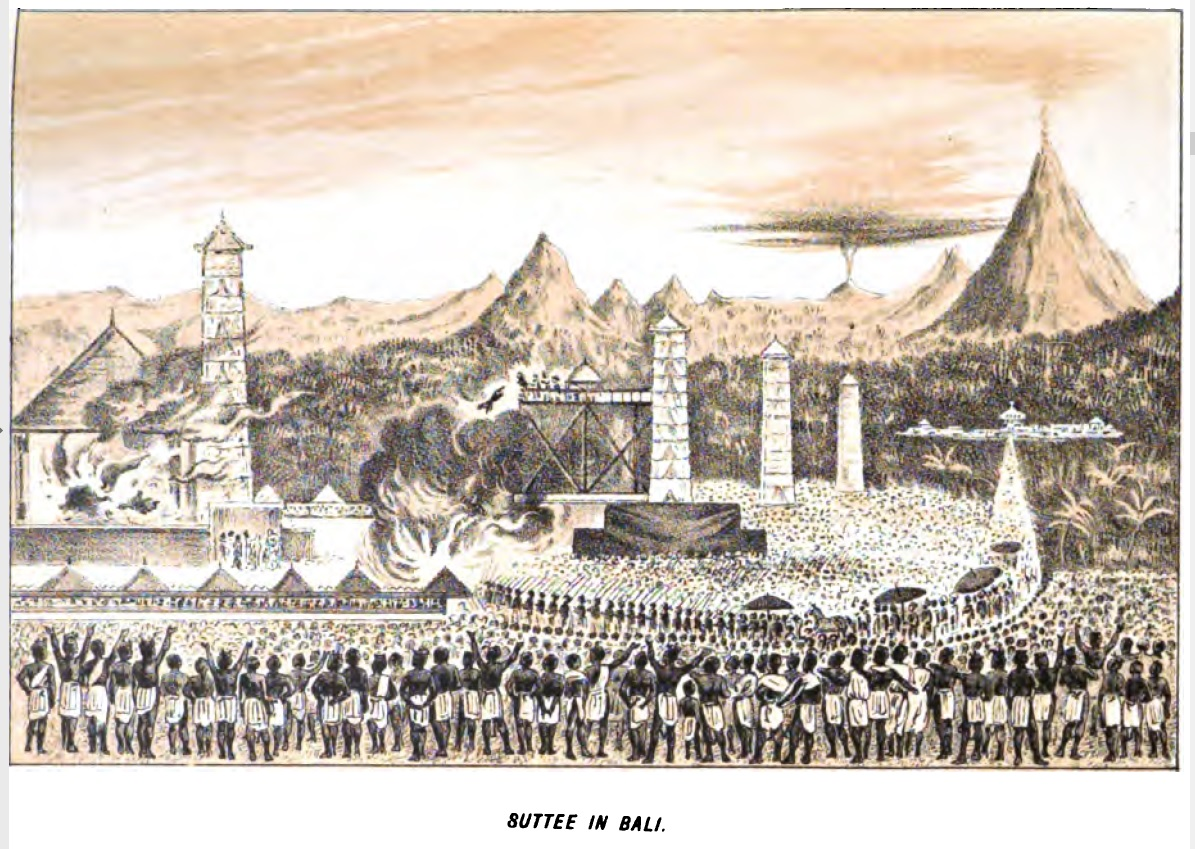
Sketch of a Suttee witnessed in Bali by Ludvig Verner Helms c. 1848, published in his book Pioneering in the Far East (1882)

While in Bali he witnessed a suttee, a Hindu practice in which a widow sacrifices herself into her deceased husband's funeral pyre. He vividly described the event in his book Pioneering in the Far East, including a sketch. He also collected paintings and carvings, along with Mads Lange. Later in life Helms and his family donated several pieces of artwork, including some carved statues, a case of cockspurs, and a painting, to the National Museum of Denmark in Copenhagen.

Helms stayed in Bali with Lange until the conflicts with the Dutch and Balinese in the 1848 and 1849 Dutch Interventions caused trade to dwindle. He played a role as courier and escort for Lange's mediations between the Dutch and Balinese in June 1849, which resulted in peaceful settlement. Lange's Kuta business gradually declined due to Dutch blockades during the interventions, epidemics, warring between the Balinese rajahs, as well as the growing use of steamships which shifted trade to competing ports in northern Bali. Lange's business never recovered, and on June 21, 1849, Helms left to find other employment in Singapore. Helms returned to Bali only once in September 1858, when he stopped en route to Europe from Sarawak to visit Lange. He was saddened to find Lange had died a few years earlier.

=== California (1850) ===
Helms returned to Singapore from Bali on July 8, 1849. From there he visited China for two months, including Canton and Hong Kong. While in Hongkong he noted the high level of anxiety of the European community due to the recent assassination of the Governor of Macao, and the growing excitement regarding the California gold rush. He returned to Singapore in September, and accepted a clerkship in the Singapore mercantile office of MacEwen and Company. After eight months, some business associates offered to send him to California with some trial shipments, and possibly open a career for him. His employers were willing to keep a place open for him, so he sailed for San Francisco in mid-June 1850 on the Danish brig Indianeren.

After an uneventful voyage across the Pacific of 67 days, he arrived in San Francisco, which was in the uproar of the California gold rush. He noted 784 large ships and several hundred coasters in the harbor, many deserted by their crews. Going ashore, he marveled at the variety of the people, the cost of lodging, the hastily built structures, and the day and night activities of the booming town. Lodging was scarce, and Helms considered himself lucky to be able to join a ramshackle "bachelor's hall" of 22 like-minded businessmen, some of whom would stay and become rich. While in San Francisco Helms witnessed one of the many San Francisco Fires; and visited the old Spanish church and mission at Dolores, abandoned at the time. He also found time to visit Flagstaff Hill (which no longer exists) overlooking the city, and create a watercolor sketch of the harbor.

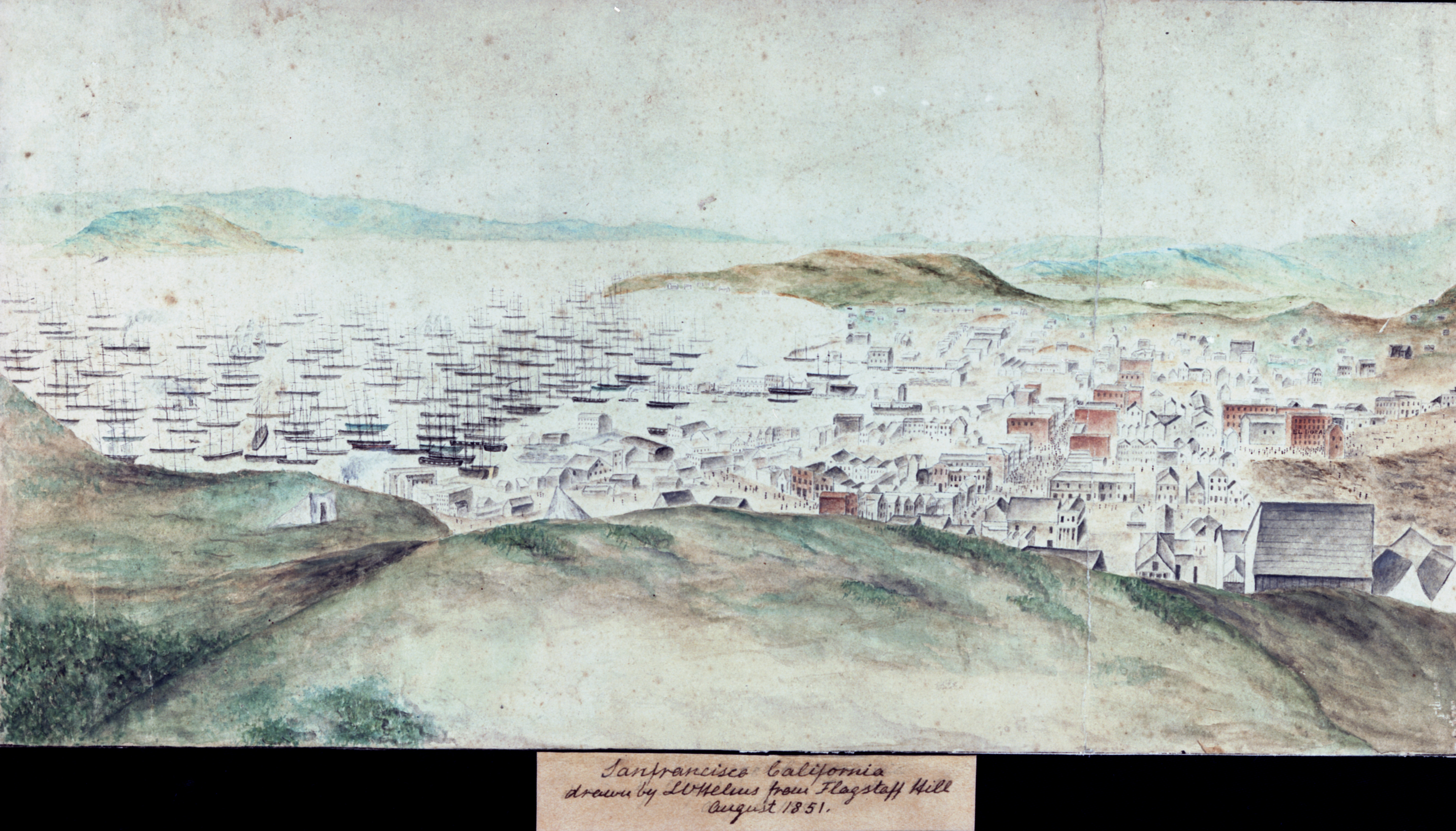
A painting of San Francisco, California by Ludvig Verner Helms in August 1850

Helms found he had arrived at an unfavorable time from a business perspective; the gold rush had peaked, and there was an excess of supplies. Helms saw a great future in California, but his business associates lost heavily and he was unable to convince them of the investment potential, so he made plans to return with the Indianeren after a few months. The captain found most of the crew had deserted, and they sailed short-handed in mid-September, 1850. Sickness broke out among the crew during the journey, and Helms himself had to act as helmsman for several days. However, they arrived safely in Hong Kong, and sailed on to Singapore, arriving December 22, where he resumed employment as a clerk.

=== Cambodia (1851) ===
While working in Singapore for MacEwen and Company, Helms was offered a post in Sarawak working for the London firm of Messrs. R. & J. Henderson, who had obtained the lease for working the antimony mines in that country. However, he could not take the position for several months, and he accepted an offer from the Singapore firm Messrs. Almeida & Sons to go on a mission to Cambodia in an attempt to open commercial relations with that country by sending a ship loaded with merchandise.

Cambodia at the time was struggling as a tributary state of Siam and a vassal of Cochin-China, which had monopolized and repressed trade, resulting in strained relationships with the European countries trading in Singapore. The king of Cambodia, King Ang Duong, sent a representative, Constantino de Montiero, to Singapore to express his desire to be on friendly terms with the English and open commercial relations, and request assistance in suppressing piracy.

In February, 1851, accompanied by Montiero, Helms sailed on the brig Pantaloon for the Cambodian port of Kampot, the only port available, as the Cochin Chinese had closed the Mekong River to Cambodia. They were wary of pirates, since Kampot was suspected of harboring them, but none were encountered. In Kampot, he arranged for transportation inland to the capital city of Udong, which was to be on ox-drawn carts. The journey of nearly 200 miles took ten days over rough roads with limited water. He found Udong unpretentious for a capital city, with buildings of thatched bamboo and wood.

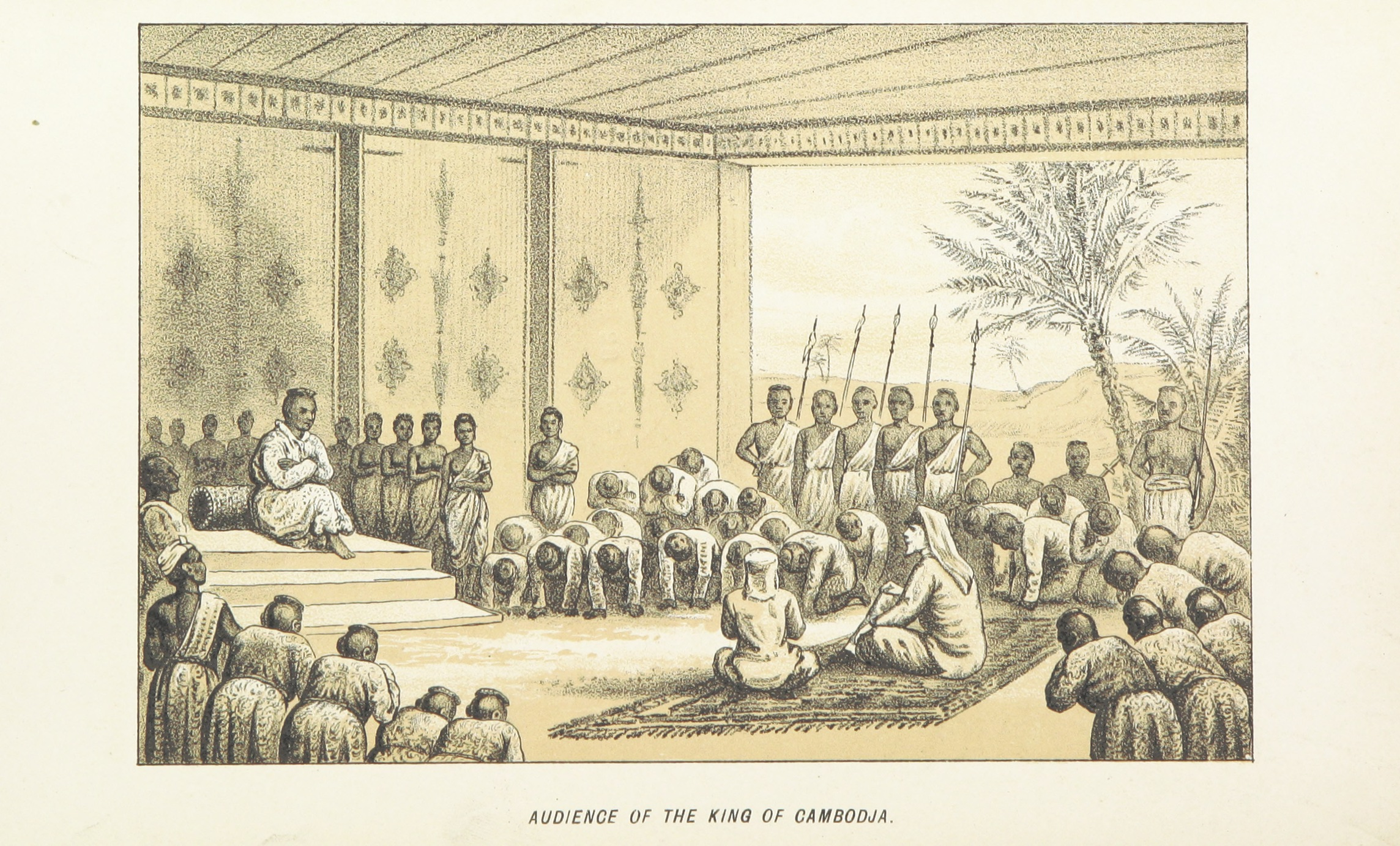
Audience of the King of Cambodia (sketch by Ludvig Verner Helms, 1851)

In Udong he successfully met with the king in an official ceremony, where he offered gifts and discussed prospects of trade, which seemed good. He later met with the king in his private apartments, where the king spoke more freely about his desire for his country to come under British protection, and for trade to resume on the Mekong river. The king asked Helms to plead his country's interests in Singapore, and also requested Helms to secure for him the necessary machinery for coining. Helms was offered a large elephant as a gift, which he gratefully declined.

After a week in Udong, Helms left for Kampot. The king provided elephants for the return journey, which was much more comfortable. Helms took with him a cargo of rice, pepper, raw silk, ivory, tortoiseshell, cardamom, gamboge, and stick-lac among other things, and also a petition from the king for British protection, which he later delivered. A large quantity of buffalo hides and horns had to be brought down by water and were intercepted by the Cochin Chinese on the Vĩnh Tế Canal.

He arrived back in Singapore in mid-June 1851. He fulfilled his promise to the king by publishing accounts of his journey in the Singapore Free Press and the Journal of the Indian Archipelago and Eastern Asia. The mission was successful from a commercial standpoint, starting a trade that gradually increased in the following years; however, he was disappointed that the British Government never acted on the king's requests. His accounts of the journey remain a rare first-hand account of King Ang Duong and Cambodia during his reign.

=== Siam (1851) ===
While in Cambodia, Helms heard rumors that Rama III, the King of Siam, had died. King Rama had been unfriendly to European merchants, rebuffing a visit by Sir James Brooke in 1850, but his expected successor, Prince Mongkut, was thought to have a different outlook and might encourage European trade. After his return to Singapore from Cambodia, Helms was offered the opportunity (probably by Singapore merchant Messrs. Silva, Joseph, & Co.) to take a similar venture to Siam to confirm the king's death and see if new trade opportunities could be opened.

He accepted the offer and sailed for Siam on June 23, 1851, again on the brig Pantaloon. Alert for pirates, they stopped at Tringanu, Calantan, and Sangara trying to confirm King Rama III's death, finally obtaining it from the rajah of Sangara. On July 6, they reached the mouth of the Menam River in Siam.

Leaving his ship anchored off the coast, Helms proceeded by land to Paknam, where he awaited approval from the Siamese government to proceed to the Siamese capitol, Bangkok. It was quickly granted, and he proceeded upriver by small boat to Bangkok, arriving on July 10. He had letters of introduction to a Portuguese merchant in Bangkok, and was hospitably received; the next day he met with the Siamese foreign minister, who granted him concessions on foreign duties and allowed his ship to proceed up the river to Bangkok to trade. He was also informed that the new King Mongkut would grant him a formal audience.

The audience took place on July 26 in the king's palace, with all the Siamese nobility present. The king asked him his business, and approved his request for trade; the king also expressed his desire that the British Government send an ambassador to Siam, and that he wished to do all in his power to encourage European commerce. Helms presented him a letter of congratulations he had composed, and was provided a response with the royal seal attached.

Two days later Helms met with the king's half-brother, Prince Chuthamani, who had been appointed as "Second King" and who also desired to adopt European customs. The troops were reviewed in Helms' presence, and he was presented with a traditional gift of gold and silver flowers.

Before his departure, Helms was invited to attend a Buddhist ceremony of the cremation of two persons related to the royal family, along with the accompanying festivities. He estimated 15,000 people attended. He sat among the king's ministers and guests, including the son of the King of Cambodia, who listened with great interest to Helms' account of his recent trip to meet his father, King Ang Duong. King Mongkut addressed a few kindly words towards Helms, and invited him to settle in Siam.

He was able to arrange for a cargo of much produce, including sugar, gamboge, and stick-lac, which exceeded the value of his trade goods. He was also entrusted with an order for military equipment to the value of over £20,000. He returned to Singapore on the Pantaloon, arriving on August 28, 1851.

Helms' visit to Siam was a commercial success and was followed by a new period of trade and improved relationships with foreigners. His petitions to the Siamese government resulted in a significant reduction in tonnage duties on foreign trade; and in 1855 England signed a treaty with Siam appointing a British Consul. Helms was likely the first European from outside Siam to be granted an audience with King Mongkut, whose reign would prove extraordinarily influential on Siam's future. Again, Helms later documented his visit in Pioneering in the Far East with vivid descriptions of the country, the ceremony, and the people.

=== Sarawak (1852-1872) ===
In 1852 Helms took up residence in Sarawak and commenced trading mainly in sago and antimony. Helms would spend the next 20 years there, then under the rule of Rajah James Brooke and his successor, Rajah Charles Brooke. While in Sarawak Helms would act as the Sarawak manager for the Borneo Company, Limited (BCL), witness pirate battles and insurrections, prospect for minerals, and raise six children before a dispute with the BCL would end his Sarawak employment.

==== Formation of The Borneo Company, Limited ====
Helms arrived in Kuching, Sarawak on the steamship Pluto on January 16, 1852, as an agent of a commercial firm to purchase antimony ore. Rajah James Brooke was absent at the time and he called upon Captain John Brooke Johnson Brooke, the rajah's nephew, and moved into a small bungalow in Kuching on a hill above the Sarawak River known as Bukit Mata.

From 1852 to 1856 he worked for McEwan and Company, trading primarily in sago and antimony. In 1856, the BCL was formed and Helms was selected by the directors to be the company's manager in Sarawak, although Rajah Brooke favored Spenser St. John. His staff originally consisted of a Chinese Cook and a native clerk named Abdullah. Helms spent much time exploring the Sarawak interior in search of minerals, and vividly describes the Borneo rivers, jungles, and natives he encountered in his book Pioneering in the Far East, including many illustrations.

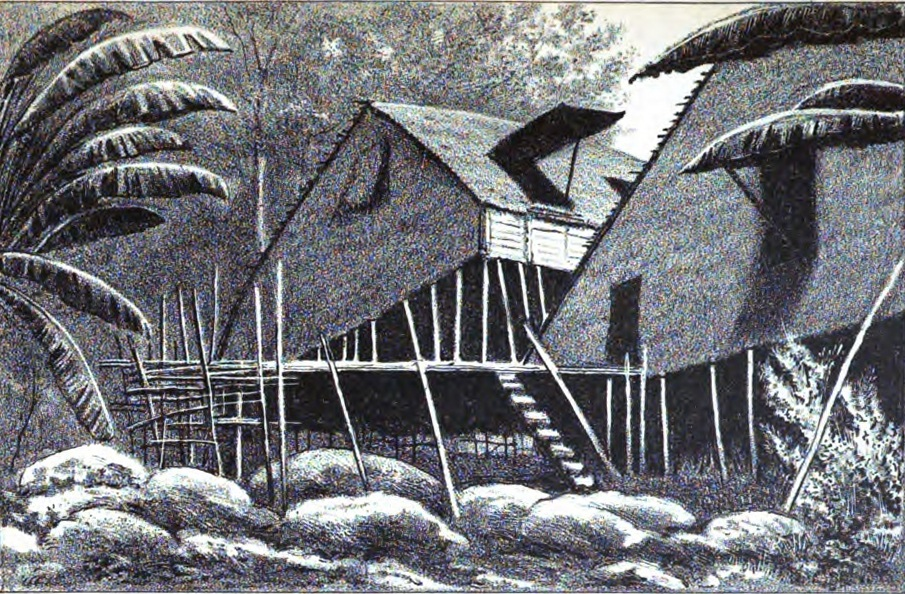
Sketch of Land Dyak Houses by Ludvig Verner Helms as it appeared in his book Pioneering in the Far East (1882)

As the Sarawak manager for the BCL, Helms prospected or traded for antimony, sago, quicksilver, gold, diamonds, gutta percha, coal, timber, and other resources. He would eventually be replaced as manager by W.G. Brodie in 1872.

==== 1857 Chinese Insurrection ====
Helms was in Kuching during the February 1857 Chinese Insurrection against Rajah James Brooke, and recounted his experiences in Pioneering through the anonymous diary of a friend, who is now known to be fellow BCL employee Paul Tidman. During the initial attack Helms retreated to a nearby Malay village, where he unsuccessfully attempted to organize a defense, and the next day he returned to Kuching and was forced to attend a meeting with the leaders of the insurrection, along with Bishop Francis McDougall, Tidman, and George Ruppell (Rajah Brooke's treasurer). During the meeting the Chinese attempted to appoint him as Rajah (thinking Rajah Brooke dead), an honor which Helms declined. He later was able to assist other Europeans in Kuching, and avoid being taken hostage by the Chinese as they retreated up the river. He then went downriver for help, and assisted the women and children in evacuating. At one point Helms and Tidman were directed by Rajah Brooke to "offer the country on any terms to the Dutch", which he did not have to do; he was on the BCL Steamer Sir James Brooke when it re-took Kuching. He then sailed at the rajah's request to Sambas to inform the Dutch of the Insurrection, and then to Singapore, where he met with Admiral Henry Keppel, who sent a warship as a demonstration of force.

==== Marriage to Anne Amelia Bruce ====
On June 19, 1858, he sailed for the UK, via Bali and Australia, to recover his health and negotiate better terms with the Borneo Company's directors in the UK. He arrived in London on March 13, 1859. In London, in 1859, he married Anne Amelia Bruce, with whom he had 10 children (Eve Louisa Mathilda, b. 1861; Dora Helen b. 1862; Dagmar b. 1864; Hilda Constance b. 1865; Katharine Annie b. 1868; Mary Sibyl b. 1870; Vera Ewen, b. 1874; Vera, b. 1876; Harold Verner Bruce, b. 1877; Paul Victor, b. 1880). After a visit to his native Denmark, Helms engaged to return to Sarawak for the BCL and returned with his wife on April 17, 1860. Upon his return, he renamed his bungalow on Bukit Mata "Aneberg" in her honor.

==== Muka pirates ====
Helms participated in the Sarawak Government's struggle with Muka rebels and pirates in 1857–1862, which was dramatically affecting the BCL sago trade. He accompanied Rajah Brooke in September 1857 and sat in on tense negotiations to settle a local feud; and went with Raja Muda John Brooke Johnson Brooke in August 1860 to participate in a perilous meeting with the local leaders for a resumption of trade. He later played a minor role in the Pirate Battle off Muka in May 1862; while visiting a sago factory at Muka, he observed a large pirate force massing at the entrance to the Muka River. He convinced a native to paddle through the pirate fleet during the night to notify Rajah Muda John Brooke, who then amassed a sizable force on the Steamer Rainbow to attack the pirates in a pitched battle. Helms' role is documented in several contemporary articles, and Helms later recounted the events in his book Pioneering in the Far East.

==== Dispute between James Brooke and John Brooke Johnson Brooke ====
Helms was a first-hand witness to the dispute between Rajah James Brooke and his nephew, Rajah Muda John Brooke Johnson Brooke, which eventually resulted in the disinheritance of the latter, and the removal of his title "Raja Muda". Helms made a point of meticulously documenting the details of the dispute in Pioneering in the Far East, particularly the perspective of John Brooke Johnson Brooke, whom he felt had not been fairly treated. In his preface to Pioneering, he states,

I may seem to awaken slumbering controversies and challenge hostile opinion. The references to the dispute between two men, both of whom I knew and admired—Rajah Brooke and his nephew, Captain Brooke—will be uninteresting to many and displeasing to some, but there are also those who will remember and who were interested in their careers, and who will see that I have attempted, though somewhat late, to do an act of justice. As one who shared the intimacy of Rajah Brooke, I hold that his whole life will stand out as great and heroic, and such a man can bear the imputation of errors in judgment, and will not need to have his faults shielded. It has been my object, while doing full justice to Sir James Brooke, to deal fairly also with the memory of his gallant nephew, who no less devoted his life and sacrificed his fortunes to the cause of civilising Borneo.

==== Tegora Mine and quicksilver ====
Helms played a large role in the discovery and development of the quicksilver (mercury) mine at Tegora in Sarawak in the late 1860s for the BCL. He is attributed with the first discovery of cinnabar ore in the area, and established the original ore processing facility at the mine. Technical problems plagued the mine for several years, but eventually the mine became profitable.

==== Departure to London ====
Helms stayed in Sarawak until May 30, 1872, when he returned to Europe via China, Japan, and California. He intended to return to Sarawak as manager for the BCL, but a lawsuit terminated his relationship, and he remained in Europe.

==== Sarawak legacy ====
The last rajah of Sarawak, Sir Charles Vyner Brooke, commented on the contribution of the BCL during Helms' era in his foreword to The Borneo Story in 1956:

So strong was the link between the State of Sarawak and the Borneo Company in the early days that Sarawak and the Borneo Company were almost synonymous terms....the present day progress and prosperity of the Country can be clearly traced to the great efforts of this Company in those early days when capital outlay and unremitting labour reaped no spectacular reward.

Helms is credited with creating one of the earliest maps of Sarawak, developed during his explorations of the region.

While in Sarawak, Helms attended court weekly and acted as jury foreman and magistrate. He was also appointed Lloyd's agent and Vice-Consul for Sarawak.

While living in Sarawak, Helms met naturalist Alfred Russel Wallace, who was collecting specimens in the region in 1854. Helms assisted him in transporting specimens, and guided him to various locations. Wallace would later become famous for his theories on natural selection along with Charles Darwin. When Wallace departed, Helms employed Wallace's assistant Charles Allen with the BCL.

Later in life Helms encountered financial difficulties, and returned to Sarawak in the early 1890s for several years to prospect.

Helms' bungalow "Aneberg" on Bukit Mata in Kuching remained as the BCL manager's house for many years after Helms' departure. During the World War II Japanese occupation it was used as a brothel for Japanese officers, and was destroyed after the war.

=== China, Japan, and California (1872) ===
==== China and Japan ====
On his return to England from Sarawak, Helms traveled from Kuching to Singapore, Saigon, Hong-Kong, and Shanghai, where he marveled at the changes over the last two decades; and then on to Nagasaki, Japan, arriving on June 28, 1872.

Helms spent a month touring Japan, including Nagasaki, Kobe, Hyōgo, Osaka, Kyoto, Arima, Jeddo (now Tokyo), Yokohama, and Enoshima Island.

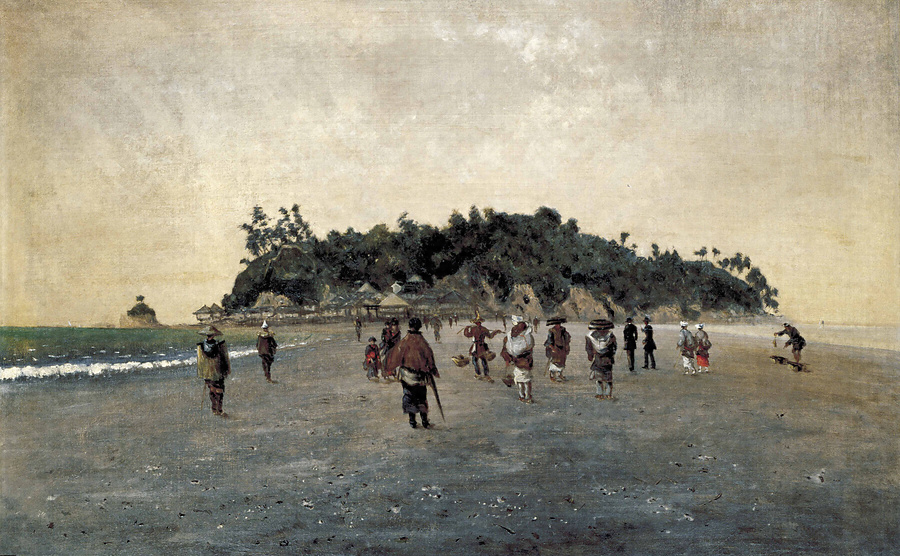
Enoshima Island as it appeared around the time of Helms' visit (painting by Takahashi Yuichi)

In Osaka he obtained special permission to travel to the Kyoto Arts and Manufactures Exhibition, a rare opportunity since Kyoto had previously been restricted for foreigners He traveled by land and sea to the different cities, traversing portions of the Tōkaidō road, and visited several Japanese temples and shrines in Kyoto and Jeddo. (Note: In Pioneering, Helms documented visits to the "Chooing" Temple (Chion-in), "Hongange" Temple (likely Higashi Honganji or Nishi Honganji), and "Henningen" temple (likely Hōnen-in) in Kyoto; and Atago Shrine, Kaneiji Temple, "Meodjen" temple (likely Edo Castle), "Venno" Temple (Likely Kan'ei-ji), "Asaxa" (likely Asakusa Shrine), and the "temples of Shiba" (Likely Zōjō-ji) in Tokyo; and the Great Buddha of Kamakura.) In his book Pioneering in the Far East, Helms extensively described the Japanese culture, gardens, religion, architecture and art from his European viewpoint, and noted the extensive change occurring as they adapted to foreign influence, often commenting prophetically:

Like, probably, all travelers in Japan, I had been delighted with the country, but astonished at the rapidity with which the ruling classes of this old and exclusive empire had divested themselves of their old ways and habits, and the docility with which the people submitted to it.... I did not then believe in the undisturbed progress of the new state of things; but, happily, time is rolling on, and the Japanese are still progressing and apparently consolidating, a spectacle that cannot but affect their mighty neighbour China.

==== California revisited ====
Helms departed from Yokohama on the steamship Alaska on August 8, 1872, arriving in San Francisco on August 31. He was amazed at the contrast in technology and comfort from his previous journey in 1849, and found San Francisco almost unrecognizable. Helms' primary purpose was to observe quicksilver mines in California (to assist in resolving problems being encountered processing the ore at his Tegora mine in Sarawak) and he visited the Almaden mine near San Jose, and the Redington, Manhattan, and Phoenix mines near Napa. He then visited the Calistoga hot springs and geysers, and the Petrified Forest before beginning his journey East across the American continent. He took the Central Pacific Railroad to Reno, Nevada, where he stopped to tour the Comstock mines via an unpleasant stagecoach journey:

...perched on some boxes on the roof of the coach, without my rug, and barely able to hold on as we rattled along the rough mountain tracks, I was numbed and shaken to pieces long before we reached Virginia city. When returning by the same coach it was daylight, and we then saw that it was full of bullet-holes, the work of robbers, while the inside was well supplied with irons, intended, as the driver told us, for unruly passengers.

He resumed his journey east via railroad, stopping only in Salt Lake City, Utah, where he had a brief interview with Brigham Young, before resuming his journey to New York and on to England.

=== Borneo Company lawsuit ===
During the last few years of his tenure at the BCL in Sarawak, Helms had been dissatisfied with the profit and loss accounting for his portion of the BCL activities. When he returned to London, one of his goals was to renegotiate his contract for a more equitable arrangement, and obtain compensation for past inequities.

One of Helms' concerns was that financial losses due to coal mining activities in the Simunjan District in Sarawak were being attributed to his division, but were not under his control. Helms had regularly expressed concern over this arrangement during his correspondence with the BCL managers in Singapore and London. He was also concerned that an 1866 agreement, signed by Helms but not ratified by the BCL Board, had never been finalized, leaving him operating under an 1860 contract which incidentally gave him a third of any profits from his division. This had not been lucrative up to 1867, when the BCL was struggling to survive, but became a subject of dispute when the mines at Tegora were discovered and became profitable.

Upon his arrival in London in 1872, he found the BCL directors resistant to correcting the problem. This was compounded by the death in 1871 of BCL Chairman Richard Henderson, Helms' long-time friend and advocate on the BCL board of directors. By 1876, when an agreement could not be reached, Helms filed a lawsuit against the BCL in the London Chancery court. Several attempts were made to settle out of court but were unsuccessful and in December, 1876, the court ruled in Helms' favor, the judge directing that the Sarawak branch of the company should be liquidated, if necessary, to pay him and appointing a receiver.

All BCL business in Sarawak was temporarily suspended in December, 1876, due to the court order, causing significant confusion and concern in Sarawak, but business appears to have resumed by January, 1877, when Helms and the Directors settled out-of-court. The settlement appears to have been quite advantageous for Helms, allowing him to retire from BCL employment.

== White Sea ==
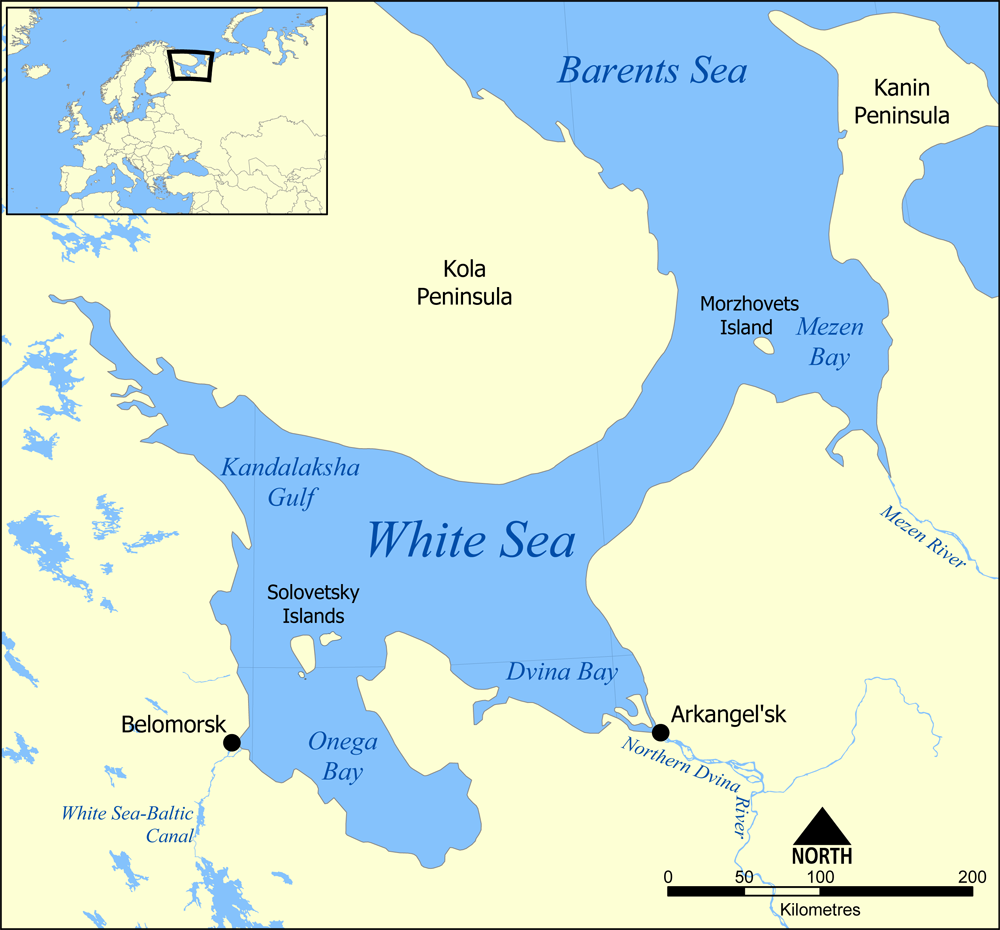
White Sea map

In 1877, Helms was asked by friends to investigate the potential of reopening some abandoned mines in the White Sea. The mines were rumored to have been opened around 1732 by Baron Curt Alexander von Schömberg, a Saxon working for the Russian government, and then been abandoned several years later when Schömberg fell out of favor with the Russian court. In July 1877, Helms traveled to St. Petersburg, Russia, to investigate the validity of the claims and obtain permissions from the Russian government. He found the records to be legitimate, and the government willing to allow it:

The concession embraced more than a dozen localities on the coast of Russian Lapland, and on islands in the White Sea. For a specified time we were to be at liberty to examine and work these, and on the expiry of that time we had the refusal to take them over for a certain consideration.

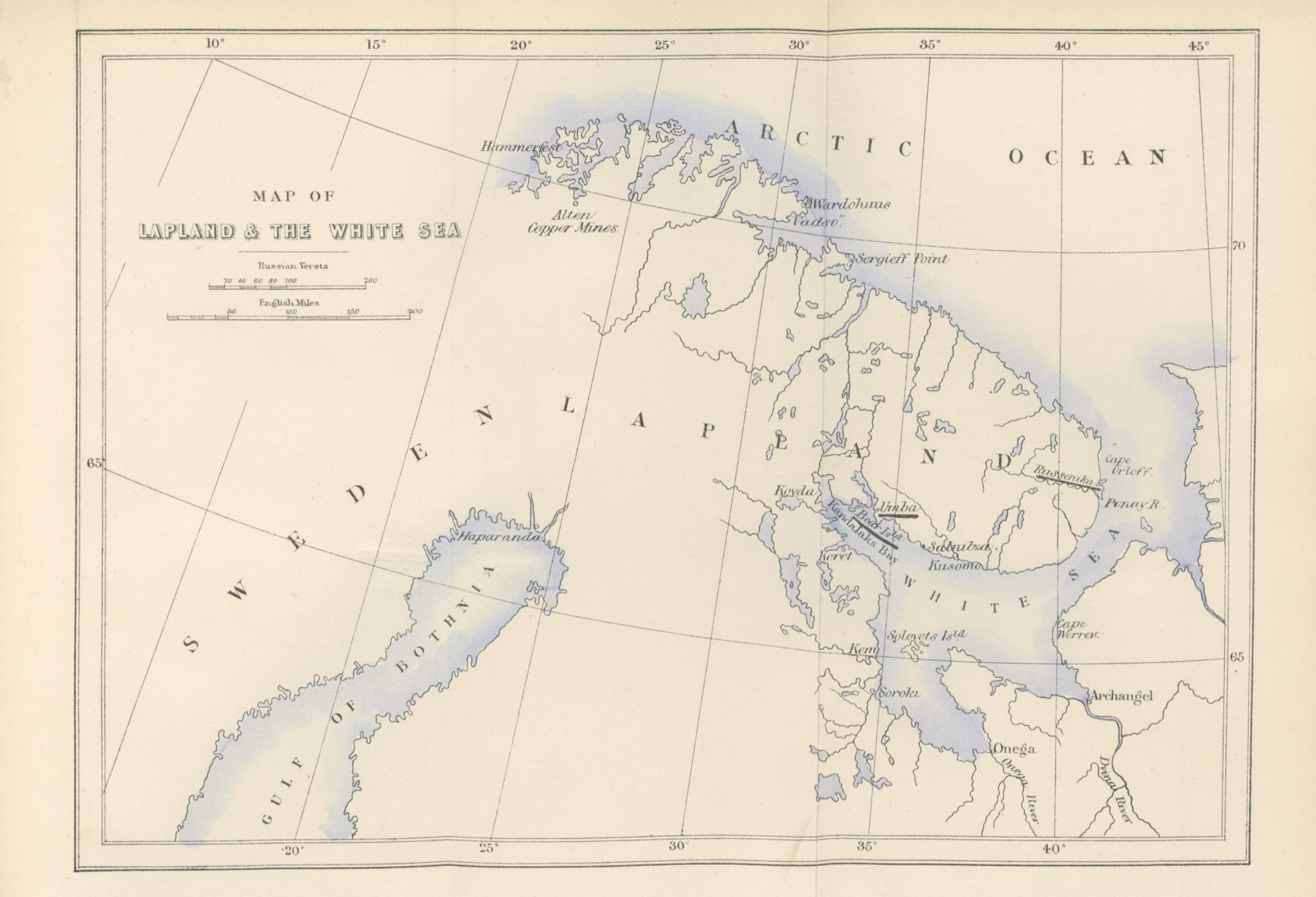
Helms' map of the White Sea showing the mine locations, published in his book Pioneering in the Far East, in 1882

Helms intended to investigate two abandoned mining areas: copper mines on the far eastern coast of the Kola Peninsula at Rusinga Creek just north of the Ponoy River; and silver mines on Bear Island in the Kandalaksha Gulf near Umba.

Helms planned the venture for the summer of 1878, during the brief period when the weather was suitable for travel and work in the extreme northern regions where the mines were located. He purchased the steamship Vestfold in Christiania, Norway (now Oslo), in May 1878, and ordered supplies to be delivered to Trondheim, Norway, and Arkhangelsk, Russia.

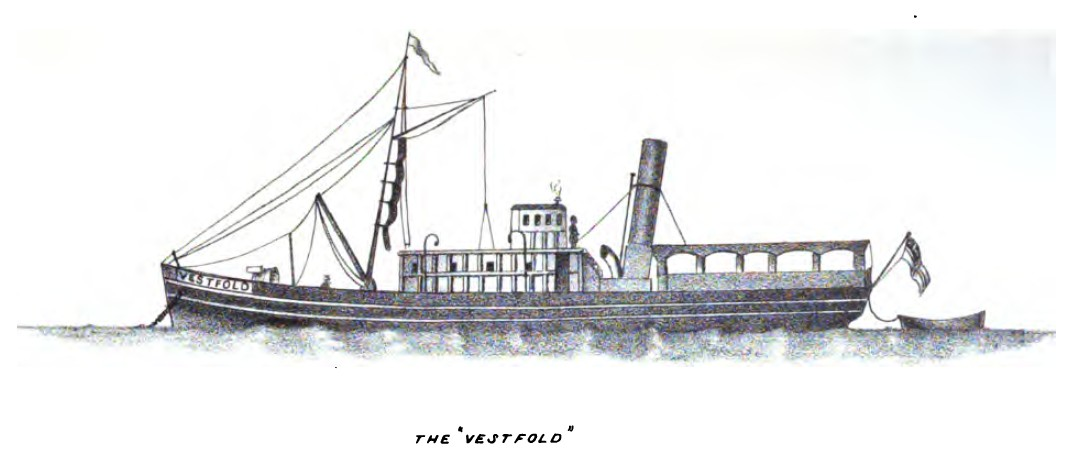
Sketch of Helms' steamship Vestfold, published in his book Pioneering in the Far East in 1882

He recruited a crew in Christiania, and traveled north to load supplies in Trondheim. He continued north, recruiting Norwegian miners at the Alten Copper Mines at Kåfjord, and traveling around the North Cape via Hammerfest, Vadsø, and into the White Sea, arriving at the mines on Rusinga Creek on June 23. Helms was joined the following day by two Russian officials who accompanied him on the remainder of the trip.

The mines on Rusinga Creek proved difficult to access due to the steep cliffs and lack of anchorage; however, Helms dispatched a team of miners to establish a base and begin prospecting, while he went for supplies at Arkhangelsk on the Vestfold on June 29.

After resupplying at Arkhangelsk, Helms attempted to return to Rusinga on July 6, but inclement weather forced the ship west and they decided to head instead for Bear Island. During this journey the Vestfold ran aground and narrowly escaped disaster, but by unloading their entire cargo of mining timbers, and most of their coal, the crew was able to float the ship free, and reached Bear Island on July 8. They located and began pumping the flooded mines to determine their extent. Helms then sailed to Arkhangelsk on July 13 to replenish coal, and returned to Rusinga creek on the Vestfold. The Rusinga party had made progress investigating the copper mines, which showed promise, but Helms felt it did not justify the risk of continued activity on the rugged coast. He decided to move the men and supplies to Bear Island, including 30 cases of dynamite which they towed in a small boat, arriving at Bear Island on July 19.

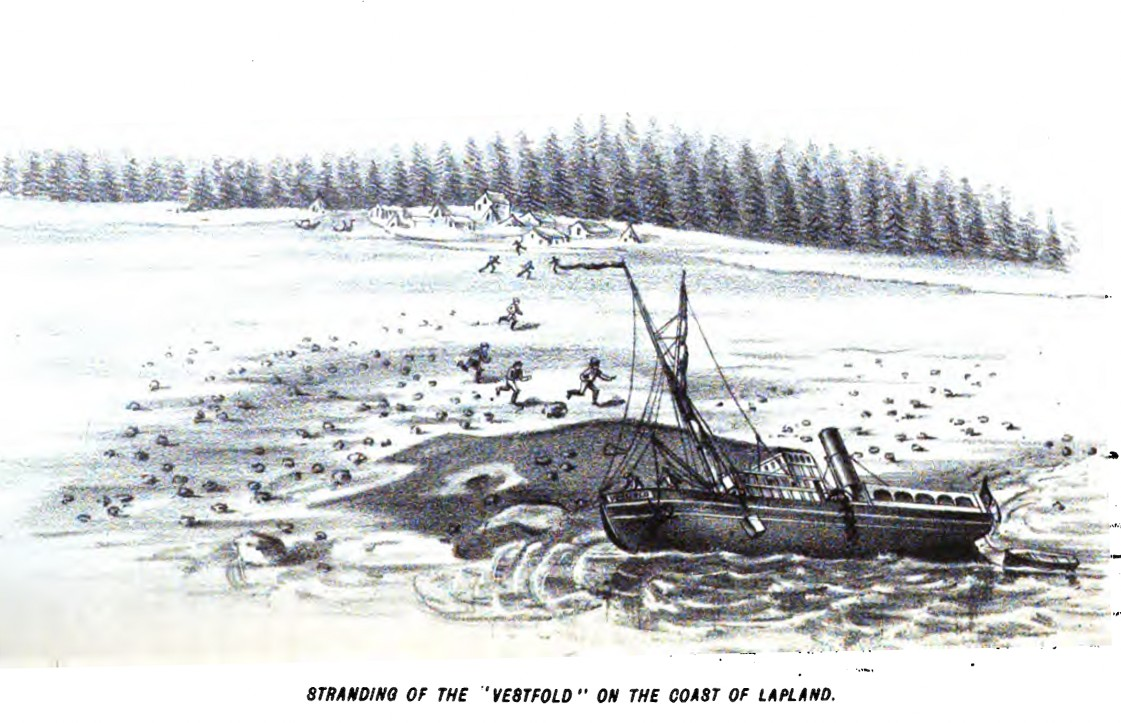
Helms' sketch of the stranding of the Vestfold, published in his book Pioneering in the Far East in 1882

They investigated three silver mines on Bear Island, and were able to pump them dry and continue excavating. They found the 150 year old submerged timbers to still be sound, and the largest mine was 153 feet deep with eight drifts. Although it was clear much ore had been taken from these mines, they failed to find any promising new veins.

Overall, Helms felt that reopening the mines would not be profitable and considered the effort unsuccessful. On August 27, the team departed Bear Island for Arkhangelsk, and home. The Vestfold sailed home to Christiania, and Helms resolved to return home to London via St. Petersburg. He traveled by steamboat down the Dvina River, disembarking at the Siya Monastery; travelled overland west to Vytegra on the shore of Lake Ladoga; and by steamship across Lakes Ladoga and Onega to St. Petersburg, where he arrived September 9. He later recounted this journey in Pioneering in the Far East, extensively describing the Northern towns, the scenery, the plight of the native Laplanders, and Russian officials he encountered and including numerous sketches of them.

== Pioneering in the Far East ==
In 1882, Helms was living in London and published Pioneering in the Far East and Journeys to California in 1849 and to the White Sea in 1878, a history of his adventures in Southeast Asia, Sarawak, and California. The book also attempted to impartially chronicle the dispute between Rajah James Brooke and his nephew, John Brooke Johnson Brooke, which resulted in the disinheriting of the latter. The book generally received good reviews, and is still in print today.

== Later life ==
Helms returned to Sarawak around 1890, where he prospected for various ores, and was in Malaysia around 1899–1903, where he was involved in establishing the Temelong Hydraulic Tin Mining Company. The mine failed in 1903, and he eventually returned to London, where he stayed until he died in Hampstead on July 26, 1918.
