= Alaska (disambiguation) =

Alaska is a state of the United States of America.

Alaska may also refer to:

== Geography ==
=== Populated places ===
==== United States ====
- Alaska, Indiana, in Owen County
- Alaska, a former unincorporated community in Caledonia Township, Kent County, Michigan
- Alaska, New Mexico, in Cibola County
- Alaska, Jefferson County, Pennsylvania
- Alaska, Northumberland County, Pennsylvania
- Alaska, Wisconsin, in the town of Pierce, Kewaunee County
- Alaska Township, Beltrami County, Minnesota

==== Zimbabwe ====
- Alaska, Zimbabwe, in the province of Mashonaland West

=== Other places ===
- 19148 Alaska, an asteroid
- Alaska Basin, a subarctic basin in Wyoming, US
- Alaska Current (Pacific Ocean), a warm-water eddy current
- Alaska Highway (Canada and US)
- Alaska Peninsula (US)
- Alaska Range (Canada, US), a mountain range
- Alaska Territory (US), historical name for Alaska before statehood, from 1912 to 1959
- Alaska Time Zone, a geographic region that keeps time by subtracting nine hours from Coordinated Universal Time
- Russian America (former-Russian Empire), historical name for present-day Alaska

== People with the name ==
- Alaska (singer) (born 1963), Mexican-Spanish singer
- Alaska P. Davidson (1868–1934), American law enforcement officer
- Alaska Taufa (born 1983), Tongan rugby union player
- Alaska Thunderfuck 5000 (born 1985), American drag performer and recording artist
- Anthime "Tim" Gionet (born 1987 or 1988), American far-right influencer better known as Baked Alaska
- David Bullock (entrepreneur) (born 1993), American entrepreneur nicknamed "Alaska"

== Arts, entertainment, and media ==
=== Films ===
- Alaska (1944 film), an American film directed by George Archainbaud
- Alaska (1996 film), an American film directed by Fraser Clarke Heston
- Alaska (2015 film), an Italian film directed by Claudio Cupellini
- Alaska: Spirit of the Wild, a 1997 American documentary film directed by George Casey

=== Literature ===
- Alaska (novel), a 1988 novel by James A. Michener
- Alaska (pamphlet), an 1875 pamphlet by Jón Ólafsson proposing an Icelandic colony in Alaska
- Alaska, the first play by British playwright D. C. Moore, produced in 2007

=== Music ===
==== Groups and labels ====
- Alaska (band), a British hard rock band
- Alaska!, an American indie rock band

==== Albums ====
- Alaska (Between the Buried and Me album), 2005
- Alaska (The Silver Seas album), 2013

==== Songs ====
- "Alaska" (song), by Maggie Rogers, 2016
- "Alaska", a song by Brockhampton from the album Saturation III, 2017
- "Alaska", a song by Cactus from the album Restrictions, 1971
- "Alaska", a song by Phish from the album Party Time, 2009
- "Alaska", a song by Pinegrove from the album 11:11, 2022
- "Alaska", an instrumental by U.K. from the album U.K., 1978

=== Television ===
- "Alaska" (Fear the Walking Dead), a 2020 episode of Fear the Walking Dead
- Jay Hammond's Alaska, a 1980s television series hosted by the former Alaska governor
- Przystanek Alaska (Alaska Station), the Polish name for the television series Northern Exposure
- Sarah Palin's Alaska, a 2010s television series, also hosted by a former Alaska governor

=== Other arts, entertainment, and media ===
- Alaska (magazine), a monthly magazine published in and about the state
- Alaska Young, a character in the book Looking for Alaska by John Green

== Ships ==
- Alaska-class cruiser
- SS Alaska (1881), British passenger ship
- USS Alaska, a name shared by several ships of the US Navy

== Other uses ==
- Alaska Airlines, a major American air carrier founded in Alaska and headquartered near Seattle, Washington
- Alaska Milk Corporation, manufacturer of milk products in the Philippines
  - Alaska Aces (PBA), a professional basketball team owned by the Alaska Milk Corporation
- Baked Alaska, a dessert
- Operation Alaska, a proposed plan to take Finnish refugees into Alaska if the Soviet Union would have conquered Finland
- Fisker Alaska, a pickup truck
- Alaska, codename of AMI Aptio firmware product

== See also ==
- AK (disambiguation)
- Alaskan (disambiguation)
