= Mukah Polytechnic =

Polytechnic in Mukah, Sarawak, Malaysia

Mukah Sarawak Polytechnic
- Politeknik Mukah Sarawak (Malay)
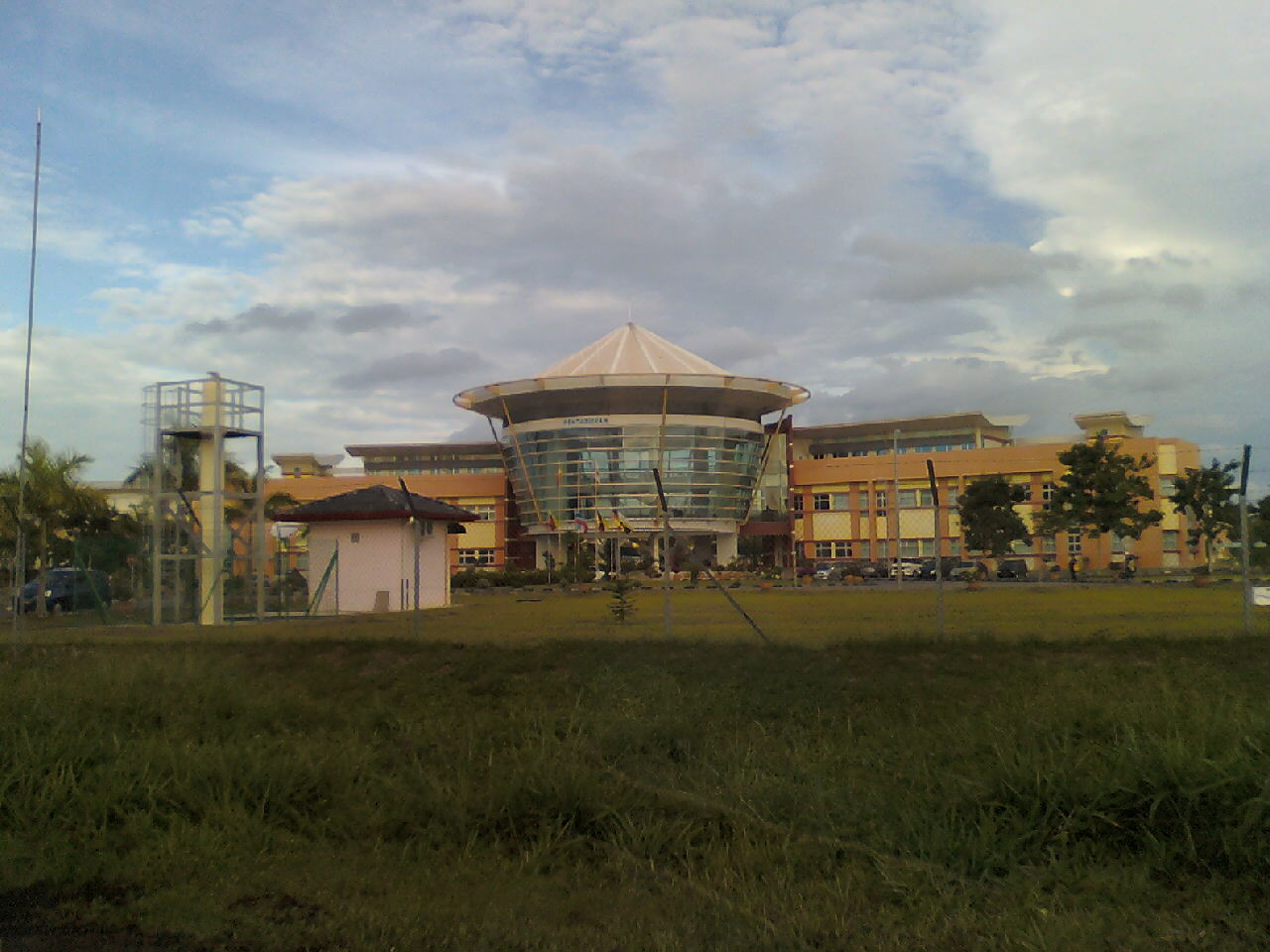
- Administrative building
- Other names: PMU
- Motto: IT Teras Entiti
- Type: TVET
- Established: 2004; 22 years ago
- Affiliations: Asia Pacific Accreditation and Certification Commission
- Director: Hisamudin Mohd Tamim
- Deputy Academic Director: Iskandar Reduan
- Students: 3,144 (2010)
- Location: POLITEKNIK MUKAH, KM 7.5, Jalan Oya, OYA, 96400 Mukah, Sarawak, Malaysia, Mukah, Sarawak, Malaysia
- Campus: 41 ha (100 acres); Suburb
- Website: www.pmu.edu.my/v5/

Mukah Sarawak Polytechnic (Malay: Politeknik Mukah; abbreviated as PMU) is a TVET institute located in Mukah, Sarawak which is the first in central region of Sarawak. Being the twentieth polytechnic in Malaysia, PMU is the third polytechnic in Borneo island after Kuching Sarawak Polytechnic and Kota Kinabalu Polytechnic. The campus is built on a 100-acre site.

The institute first operation began at Sibu Technical Secondary School in 2004. The first intake of students was in July 2005 session with pilot courses such as Certificate in Information Technology, Certificate in Civil Engineering and Certificate in Business Studies. Course offerings increased a year later where Diploma level courses were also offered by all five major academic departments. When PMU first started it had only 156 students, but in 2010 the population has increased to 3,144.

== Directors of Mukah Polytechnic ==
No.	Director	Term In office
1.	Hj. Noor Azahan Othman	2005 – 2005
2.	Shahbudin Man	2005 – 2006
3.	Mordin Mohamad	2006 – 2009
4.	Dr. Mohd Nasir Abu Hassan K.M.N	2010 – 2011
5.	Wan Muhammad Afifi Wan Abdullah	2011 – 2013
6.	Lt. Col. Abdubrani Yunus	2013 – 2019
7.	Dullah Muluk A.D.K	2019 – 2021
8.	Dr. Zamzam Mohd Walid	2021 – 2023
9.	Sarip	2023 – present

== Programme offered ==
- Department of Civil Engineering
  - Diploma in Civil Engineering
- Department of Electrical Engineering
  - Diploma in Electrical and Electronic Engineering
  - Diploma in Electrical Engineering (Communication)
- Department of Mechanical Engineering
  - Diploma in Mechanical Engineering
- Department of Commerce
  - Diploma in Accountancy
  - Diploma in Business Studies
  - Diploma in Secretarial Science
- Department of Information, Communication and Technology
  - Diploma in Information Technology (Digital Technology) Software and Application Development
  - Diploma in Information Technology (Digital Technology) Network System
- Department of General Studies
  - Islamic and Moral Education Unit
  - English Language Unit
- Department of Mathematics, Science and Computer
  - Pre-Diploma (Science)

Academic

The offering of general subjects, science and mathematics is offered by the Department of General Studies (JPA) and the Department of Mathematics, Science and Computer (JMSK).

In addition to the full-time courses, PMU also offers short-term courses that are open to the public and the local community under the Time Sector Privatization (TSP) program.
