= Alaskan (disambiguation) =

Alaskan is a demonym for a person from the U.S. state of Alaska.

Alaskan or Alaskans may also refer to:

== In arts and entertainment ==
- The Alaskans, an American Western television series
- The Alaskan, a 1924 silent adventure drama
- Jay York, nicknamed "The Alaskan", a professional wrestler of the 1960s and 1970s

== Companies ==
- Alaskan Brewing Company, a large craft brewery based in Juneau, Alaska
- Denali Alaskan Federal Credit Union, a credit union based in Anchorage, Alaska; a predecessor was known as the Alaskan Federal Credit Union from 1984 to 1997

== Firearms and ammunition ==
- Ruger Alaskan, a revolver introduced in 2005
- .50 Alaskan, an ammunition cartridge dating from the 1950s

== Places ==
- Alaskan Hotel and Bar in Juneau, Alaska, listed on the National Register of Historic Places in Alaska
- Alaskan Way, a street in Seattle, Washington

== Vehicles ==
- Alaskan (1883 steamship), a steamship which operated from 1884 to 1889
- USS Alaskan (ID-4542), a U.S. Navy cargo ship and troop transport in commission from 1918 to 1919
- Renault Alaskan, a French mid-size pickup truck

== See also ==
- Alaska (disambiguation)
