= SS Alaska =

A number of steamships have been named Alaska

- SS Alaska (1867) for Pacific Mail Steamship Company
- SS Alaska (1871)
- SS Alaska (1881)
- SS Alaska (1883), a steam launch on the National Historic Ships register in the United Kingdom
- SS Alaska (1889), an American passenger ship sunk in 1921
- SS Alaska (1910)
- SS Alaska (1918)
- SS Alaska (1922)
- SS Alaska (1923), operated 1942–1947 as War Shipping Administration cargo ship/troopship serving Alaska

== See also ==
- Alaska (disambiguation)
- USS Alaska
