= Mukah =

Town in Sarawak, Malaysia

- Town and district capital

Other transcription(s)
  - Jawi: موكه
  - Chinese: 沐胶
  - Tamil: முக்கா
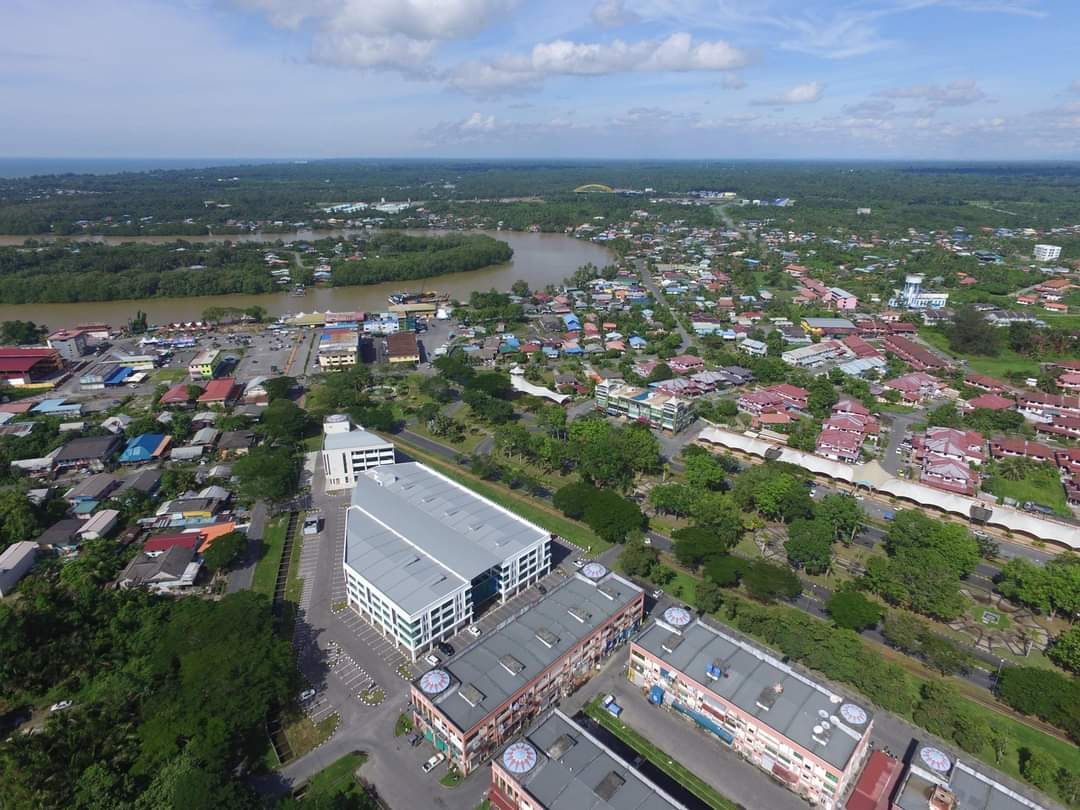
- Aerial view of Mukah Town

- Seal
- Nickname: "The Melanau Heartland"
- Motto: Mukah Maju, Rakyat Sejahtera (Mukah Progressive, Prosperous People)
- Mukah in Malaysia Mukah (Asia) Mukah (Earth)
- Coordinates: 2°53′46″N 112°4′43″E
- Country: Malaysia
- State: Sarawak
- Division: Mukah
- District: Mukah
- Malano Kingdom: 700 AD
- Founded by James Brooke: 1861
- 10th Division of Sarawak: 1 March 2002
- Division Office location: Mukah

Government
  - Type: Dalat and Mukah District Council
  - Resident: Datu Kueh Lei Poh
  - Mayor: Kr. Aini bin Suhaili

Area
  - Mukah town: 2,536 km^{2} (979 sq mi)

Population (2016, projected)
  - Mukah town: 49,900 (District)
  - Density: 19.7/km^{2} (51.0/sq mi)
- Time zone: UTC+08:00 (MST)
  - Summer (DST): UTC+08:00 (Not observed)
- Postal code: 96xxx
- Area code(s): 084 (landline only)
- Vehicle registration: QS (for all vehicles except taxis); HQ (for taxis only)
- Website: mukah.sarawak.gov.my/web/home/index/

Mukah (muːkəh), historically known as Muka, is a coastal town in Malaysia which has served as the capital and the administrative center of the Mukah Division since 1 March 2002.

The district also covers an area of 2,536 square kilometres (979 sq mi) with a population about 49,900 in the Mukah town and 18,800 in the Dalat administrative town of Dalat District.

It is located on the Borneo island, by the South China Sea, about 2 hours by road from the city of Sibu. Mukah is also accessible by air by AirBorneo from Kuching and Miri. The duration of both flights is about one hour. There are also speed boats connecting the town of Dalat (about 30 kilometres [19 mi] from Mukah) to Sibu. The speed boat trip takes approximately 2 hours.

== Etymology ==
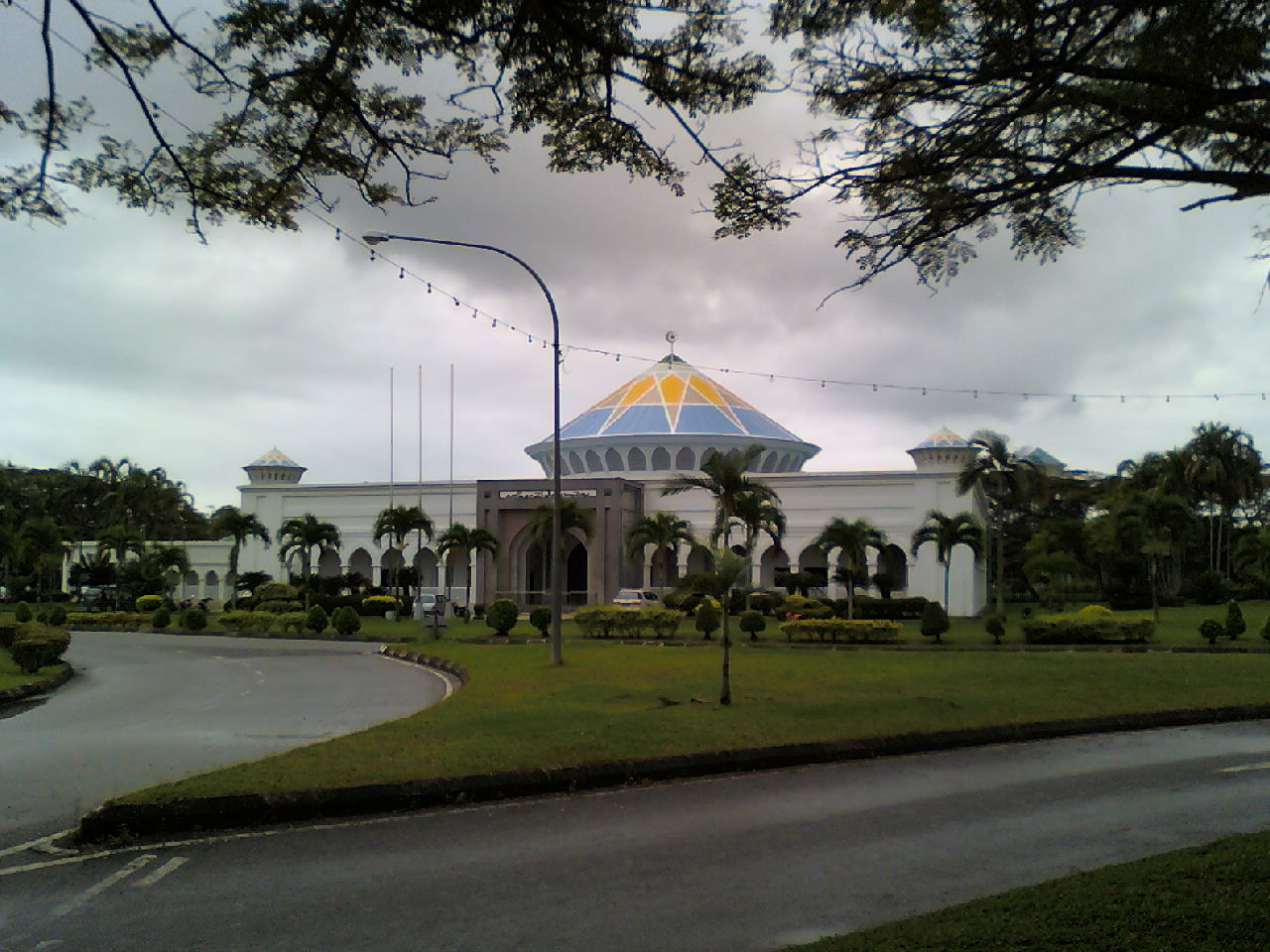
Masjid Setia Raja, Mukah

There are several versions of the origin of the name "Mukah". The word "Mukah" is similar to the Malay word "muka" which means face. It was said that the town was named after the face of a mysterious beautiful woman who helped three shipwreck merchants from Brunei.

Another version was that a beautiful face appeared on the surface on the sea to fishermen. However, these does not explain on why the town adopted a Malay name instead of a Melanau name as the majority of the population here are the Melanau people. The Melanau word for face is "jawai".

Mukah town has statues of Ikan Merah (Red Snapper) and Udang (Prawn) that reflect the importance of the fishery industry to the town.

== History ==
The Melanau people is the earliest indigenous group living in Mukah. The earliest documentation of Mukah can be found in the annals of the Majapahit empire where a place known as "Melano" was paying tribute to the empire. Although this Mukah describe includes other Melanau areas along the coastline of Sarawak. The place then became part of the Bruneian Empire in the 13th century. Mukah was later sold to the Raj of Sarawak in 1860.

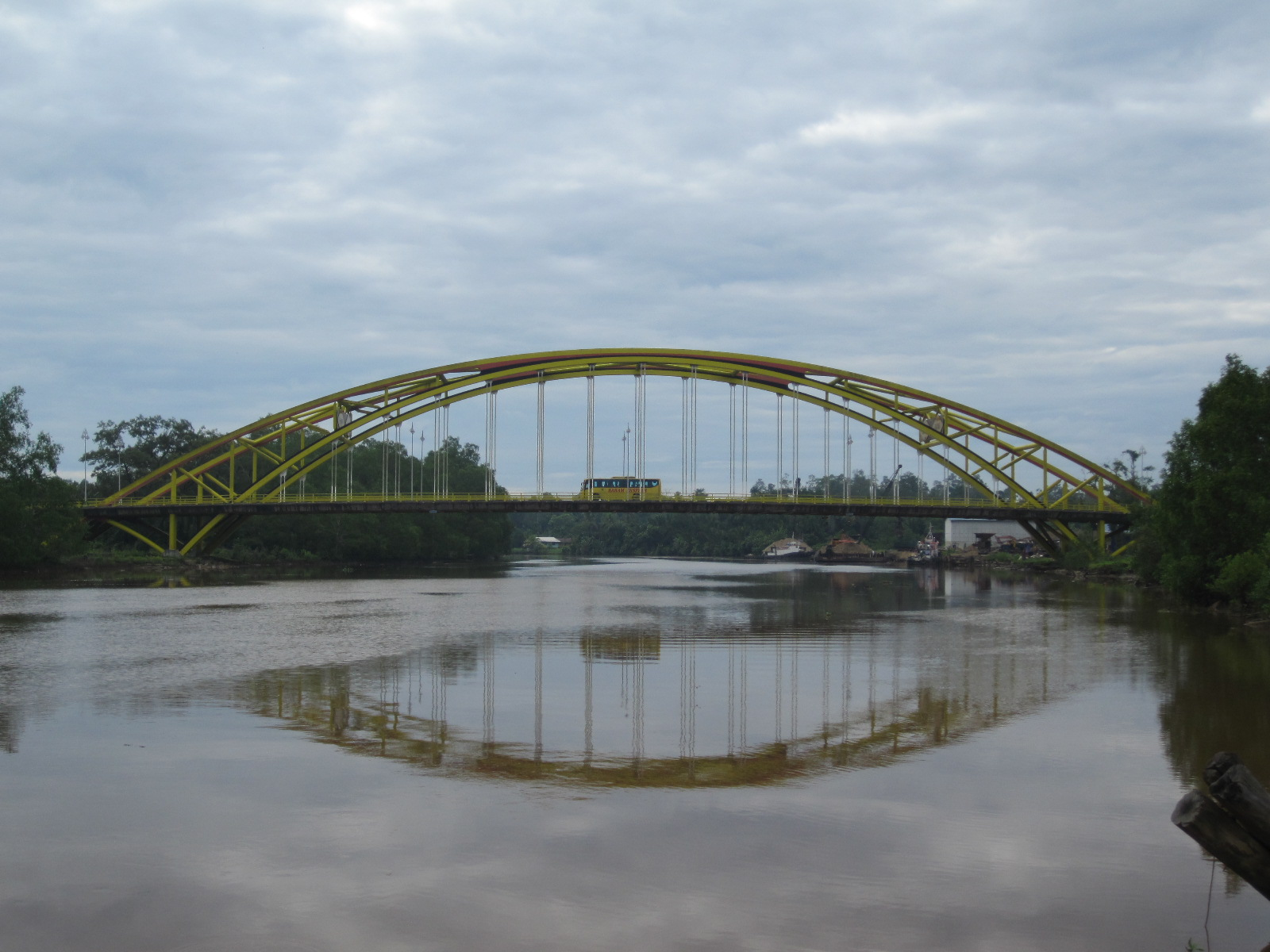
Batang Mukah Bridge, one of the most notable structures of Mukah.

In November 1862, the Rajah Muda rescued several civilians from the Moro Pirates after a pitched naval battle off the coast of Mukah. During the fighting, Brooke's steamer named Rainbow sank four prahus and damaged one other with cannon fire. Over 100 pirates were killed or wounded in the engagement while Brooke, the bishop Francis McDougall and their Sarawakian followers, were mostly unscathed.

== Government ==
Mukah and Dalat District Office is the governing body of the Mukah and Dalat districts, including the towns. The district office was established in 1947 as Native Local Authority (NLA). The district office then expands it power to Dalat, Oya, Balingian in 1981.

== Geography ==
Mukah town is located at the mouth of the Mukah River. Mukah is located on peat land that is still covered by peat swamp forests.

== Climate ==
Mukah has a tropical rainforest climate (Af) with heavy to very heavy rainfall year-round.

Climate data for Mukah
Month	Jan	Feb	Mar	Apr	May	Jun	Jul	Aug	Sep	Oct	Nov	Dec	Year
Mean daily maximum °C (°F)	29.9 (85.8)	30.1 (86.2)	30.9 (87.6)	31.7 (89.1)	32.1 (89.8)	31.9 (89.4)	31.8 (89.2)	31.5 (88.7)	31.4 (88.5)	31.2 (88.2)	30.9 (87.6)	30.5 (86.9)	31.2 (88.1)
Daily mean °C (°F)	26.1 (79.0)	26.3 (79.3)	26.8 (80.2)	27.3 (81.1)	27.6 (81.7)	27.4 (81.3)	27.1 (80.8)	27.0 (80.6)	26.9 (80.4)	26.9 (80.4)	26.7 (80.1)	26.4 (79.5)	26.9 (80.4)
Mean daily minimum °C (°F)	22.4 (72.3)	22.5 (72.5)	22.8 (73.0)	22.9 (73.2)	23.2 (73.8)	22.9 (73.2)	22.4 (72.3)	22.5 (72.5)	22.5 (72.5)	22.7 (72.9)	22.6 (72.7)	22.4 (72.3)	22.6 (72.8)
Average rainfall mm (inches)	586 (23.1)	425 (16.7)	328 (12.9)	188 (7.4)	168 (6.6)	190 (7.5)	165 (6.5)	230 (9.1)	234 (9.2)	264 (10.4)	305 (12.0)	498 (19.6)	3,581 (141)
Source: Climate-Data.org

== Demographics ==
In 2017, Mukah District had a projected population of 49,900.

== Economy ==
Sago processing and fishing are the two main economic activities in Mukah.

Since 2008, Mukah is the economic centre of Sarawak Corridor of Renewable Energy (SCORE). Press Metal Sdn Bhd built its first aluminium smelting plant in Mukah in 2009.

== Transport ==
=== Air ===
In term of air connectivity, Mukah was served by Mukah Airport (STOLport) since the 1960s. Mukah Old STOLport airport was only able to accommodate an 18-seater Twin-Otter aircraft. The airport used to operate routes to Kuching and Miri. An effort has been made to upgrade the Mukah airport.

On 17 June 2021, the new Mukah Airport was opened and began to its operation to replace the previous Mukah short-release and landing (STOLport) functions. The new airport can handle up to 264,000 passengers per year, as well as the new runway could indeed support turbine planes and helicopters.

=== Road ===
Mukah is linked to Selangau through the Mukah-Selangau road and to Bintulu through Mukah-Kuala Tatau road.

=== Buses ===
Bus express to Dalat, Sibu and Bintulu are available.

== Other facilities ==
=== Education ===
Mukah Polytechnic (PMU) is the 20th and the third polytechnic in Borneo after Politeknik Kuching and Politeknik Kota Kinabalu, Sabah. The PMU campus is built on a 100-acre site and is equipped with modern infrastructure and state of the art educational facilities.

PMU's first operation began at Sibu Technical Secondary School in 2004. The first intake of students was in the July 2005 session with pilot courses such as Certificate in Information Technology, Certificate in Civil Engineering and Certificate in Business Studies. Course offerings increased a year later where Diploma level courses were also offered by all five major academic departments.

Maktab Rendah Sains MARA Mukah (MRSM) was opened in 2010. It is a boarding school that provides good quality education for selected secondary school students. SMK St. Patrick, the oldest secondary school in Mukah town and division was established in 1905. SMK Three Rivers was established in 1961 to serve the education needs of the people living in the Mukah, Oya, and Balingian river basins. SMK Mukah was opened in 1999.

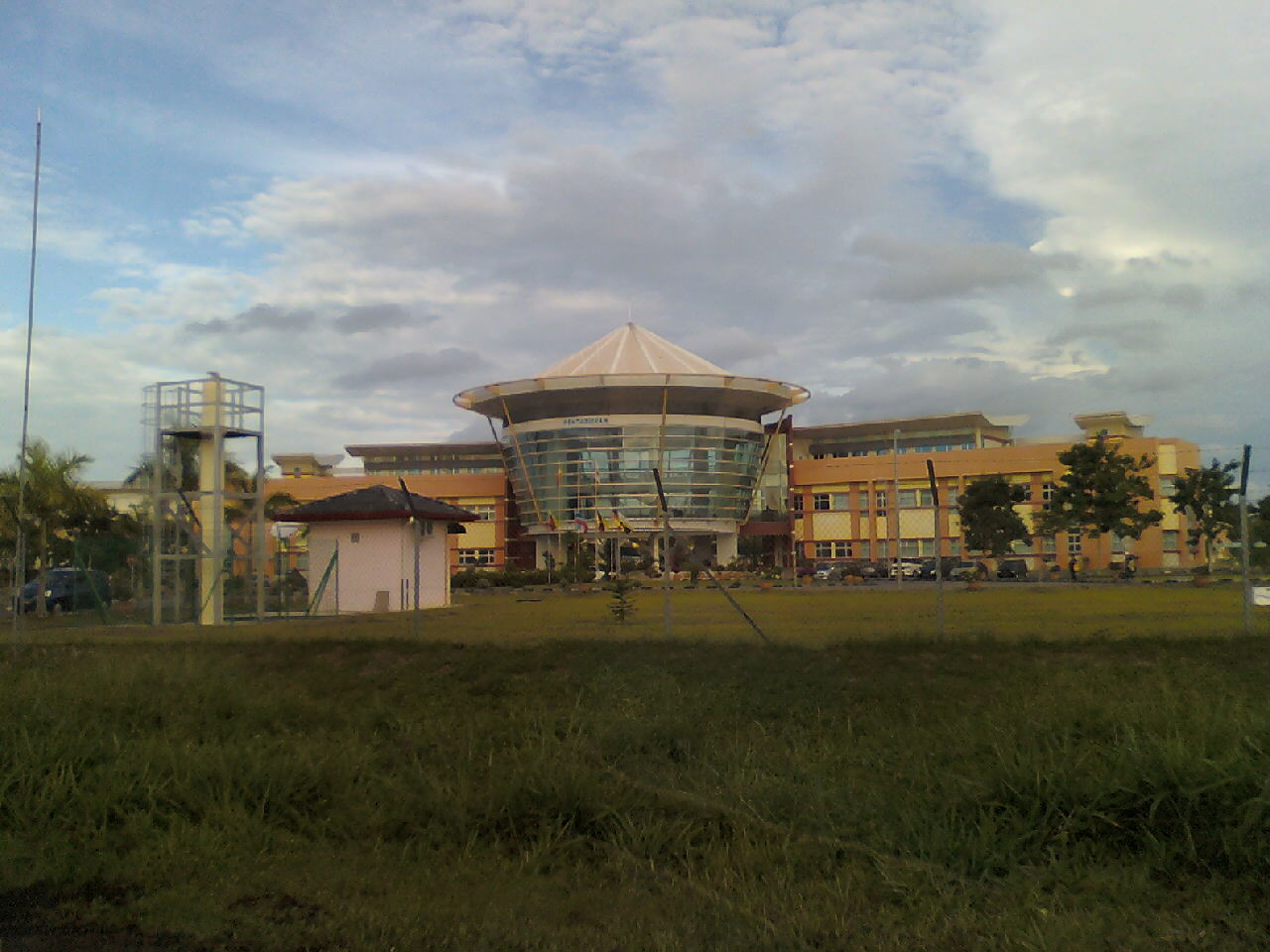
Mukah Polytechnic

UiTM Sarawak Mukah campus was opened on 16 November 2015 in order to train enough manpower for Sarawak Corridor of Renewable Energy (SCORE). Its campus is located 7.5 km (4.7 mi) from the town centre. Among the courses offered are Pre Diploma (Commerce and Science), Diploma in Business Studies, Diploma in Banking Studies, Diploma in Herbal Production, Diploma in Aquaculture and Diploma in Plantation Management.

Centre of Technical Excellence (CENTEXS) Mukah was opened in 2020 and began to operate in 2021. The completion of the campus itself making it the fifth CENTEXS campus to be built outside of Kuching after Lundu, Dalat, Lawas and Betong.

=== Future Developments ===
The proposed development project for Kolej Laila Taib (KLT) here commenced since 2017 and once completed, will add another institution of higher learning in Mukah. The KLT project is located adjacent to Politeknik Mukah (PMU), about one kilometre off Jalan Mukah-Oya, which is 7 km (4.3 mi) from town centre. Nearby PMU and the KLT project is Universiti Teknologi Mara (UiTM) Mukah Campus, 1.7 km (1.1 mi) away at the end of the same spur road.

The site for the proposed Universiti Malaysia Sarawak's (Unimas) Excellent Research Centre project is also located within the same area at the same spur road, about 300m from PMU and KLT project.

Meanwhile, the proposed Giat Mara project nearby the CENTEXS project is scheduled to complete by November 2021. Once completed, these projects are expected to propel this district to emerge as an education hub in the near future.

== Declaration of Mukah Division ==
State Executive Council, the demarcation of the Sibu Division and Sarikei Division Administrative areas to form the Mukah Division was effective on 1 March 2002. Regarding to this, the Mukah Division was declared as the Tenth (10) Division on 1 March 2002 by the Most Honourable Pehin Sri Haji Abdul Taib Mahmud, Chief Minister of Sarawak. The recognition of Mukah as a Division has opened a new chapter in the administrative machinery of the state of Sarawak when it covers the entire coastal area in the central part of Sarawak. Thus, the declaration makes Mukah District as the administrative center and the capital of the division.

== Culture and leisure ==
Lamin Dana cultural Lounge is located at Kampung Tellian. It is a place where the residents of the village showcase their traditional arts, crafts, and authentic Melanau food. A Melanau delicacy named Umai is one of the popular dishes in the town. It is a raw fish salad served with sago pellets. Sago is the staple food for the Melanau people. They usually takes sago together with fish, Sambal, and Ulam.

Mukah Kaul festival is held annually at the third week of April. It was a traditional ritual by the Melanau people for thanksgiving and continuation of good fortune by appeasing the spirits of the sea, land, forests, and farms.
