= Jón Ólafsson (journalist) =

Icelandic editor, journalist, and poet

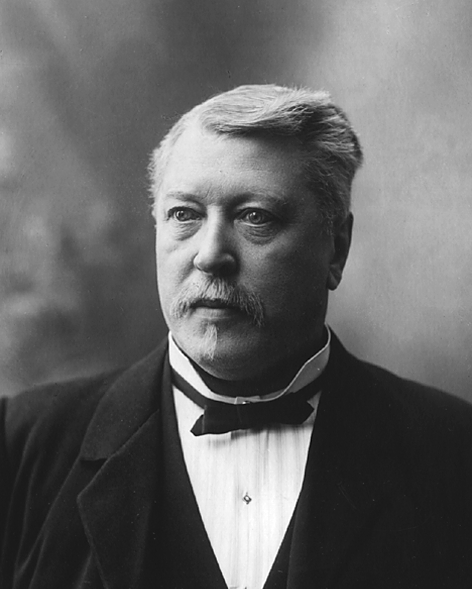
Jón Ólafsson.

Jón Ólafsson (20 March 1850 – 11 July 1916) was an Icelandic editor, journalist, and poet.

He was the half-brother of Páll Ólafsson. He became a journalist in Iceland in 1868, but due to disobedience to the authorities, he had to emigrate to North America in 1872. There, a lawyer convinced him that it would be a good idea for people from Iceland to immigrate into Alaska, especially to the Island of Kodiak. Jón made a petition to President Ulysses S. Grant and met with him, but neither that nor the bill to Congress lead to success, as the government of Canada had in the meanwhile offered land around Winnipeg to immigrants from Iceland. Jón wrote a book on his ideas for an Icelandic Alaska detailing his high hopes.
