= USS Alaska =

Four ships of the United States Navy have been named USS Alaska in honor of the territory acquired by the United States from Russia in 1867 which later became the state of Alaska:

- USS Alaska (1868), a wooden-hulled screw sloop-of-war in commission from 1869 to 1883 that saw numerous small actions
- USS Alaska (ID-3035), a steam trawler chartered to serve as a minesweeper during World War I, in commission from 1918 to 1919
- USS Alaska (CB-1), the lead ship of the Alaska class of large cruisers, in commission from 1944 to 1947; she saw action in the last days of World War II
- USS Alaska (SSBN-732), an Ohio-class ballistic missile submarine commissioned in 1986 and currently in service

== See also ==
- Alaska (disambiguation)
- SS Alaska
- USS Alaskan
- USS Alarka
