= Alaska (pamphlet) =

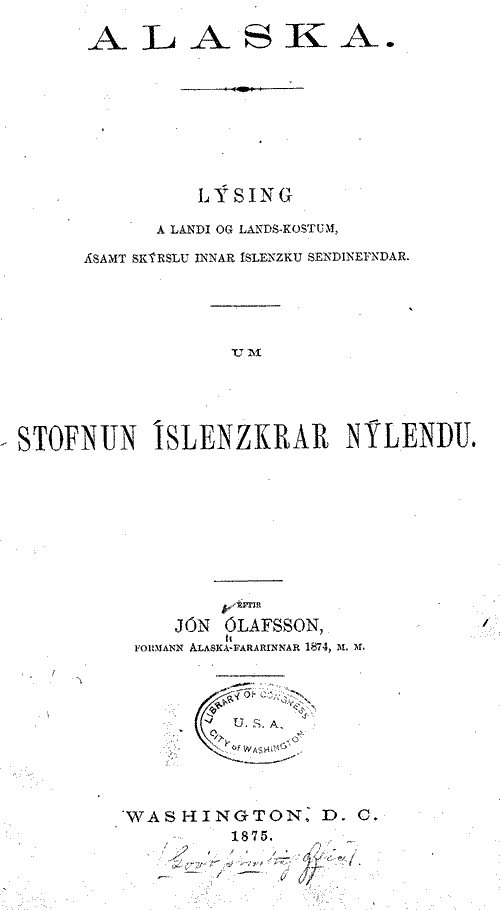
Front page of Alaska

Alaska, lýsing á landi og lands-kostum, ásamt skýrslu innar íslenzku sendinefndar : um stofnun íslenzkrar nýlendu is a pamphlet by Jón Ólafsson detailing Alaska and the possibility of founding an Icelandic colony there. Included in the pamphlet is the report of the Icelandic delegation. It was published in 1875 in Washington and re-published on February 26, 2005 by Project Gutenberg.

The report has high hopes and dreams of a future world where Icelandic will surpass English in the world following the founding of the colony and years of rapidly populating it. The report includes a calculation where 10 thousand Icelanders would form the colony and then double their numbers every 25 years, so that in three to four centuries they would number 100 million, covering the area from Hudson Bay to the Pacific Ocean. From there Icelandic could spread south, replacing the degenerate English tongue, as it is put.

The author's disdain for English is more evident as he describes it as "being a prostitute who has laid with every language of savages and idiots". The nature and weather of Alaska is detailed for the benefit of future settlers.

Although the proposal for colonization of Alaska never materialized, the report was cited in Alaskan government reports as late as 1904.
