= Rainbow (1859 ship) =

Sarawak Government's first steamship

History

United Kingdom
- Builder: Blackwood & Gordon, Paisley
- Launched: 1859

Sarawak
- Owner: James Brooke
- Cost: £4,100
- Sponsored by: Angela Burdett-Coutts
- Christened: Rainbow
- Acquired: June 1860
- In service: Arrived at Singapore 30 Jan 1861
- Fate: Sold to the Straits Settlements, May 1866

Straits Settlements
- Name: Colonial Steamer Rainbow
- Cost: $18,000
- Acquired: May 1866
- Fate: Sold at public auction to Henry Nicolai Velge in May 1871.

United Kingdom
- Name: Rainbow
- Owner: Henry Nicolai Velge
- Cost: $11,025
- Acquired: May 1871
- Fate: Unknown

General characteristics
- Class & type: Iron Screw Steamer
- Type: Passenger / Cargo
- Tonnage: 145 grt / 99nrt
- Length: 127.5 ft
- Beam: 18.0 ft
- Depth: 8.9 ft
- Propulsion: 2cyl 20"x20" 30nhp 1-screw
- Speed: 9kn

Out of concern for the security of Sarawak, Angela Burdett-Coutts gifted an iron screw steamer to James Brooke, Rajah of Sarawak in June 1860 at the cost of £4,100. The steamer was christened Rainbow by Burdett-Coutts and became the first steamer owned and operated by the Sarawak Government. James Brooke described the Rainbow as a "hope in the clouds".

== Service ==
Once arriving at Singapore in Jan 1861, the 'Rainbow' was converted into a gunship. The ship's cabin was reinforced with 3" wooden planking and she was armed with 2 x 9-pounder cannons on transverse carriages on the fore and poop decks, as well as having 2 x 6-pounders mounted to guard her sides.

The 'Rainbow' made frequent regular trips to Singapore and was also used to patrol Sarawak's recently expanded coastline for pirates. Its most famous action being the Battle off Mukah in May 1862 when it engaged and won a battle against 6 pirate prahus which came from Tawi Tawi.

== Later career ==
By 1866, James Brooke sought a larger vessel and sold the Rainbow to the Government of the Straits Settlements for $18,000 (approx. £4,000). Upon the transfer, she began flying the Blue Ensign, denoting her status as a British government vessel. She was sold off by public auction on 24 May 1871 to Henry Nicolai Velge for $11,025.

== Fate ==
There is an S.S. Rainbow that runs for many years in the Straits after 1871, but it's unclear if it's the original ship or a replacement with the same name.
