= Great Kayan Expedition =

Large Brooke-era punitive expedition in the interior of Sarawak

The Great Kayan Expedition was a major 1863 military campaign undertaken under the authority of Charles Brooke, then the Tuan Muda (heir presumptive) and later the second White Rajah of Sarawak. The campaign mobilized a large force of allied Iban warriors to move against communities identified in Brooke-era sources as upriver Kayan groups in the upper basin of the Rajang River in Borneo. It is regarded by historians as one of the most significant and far-reaching upriver expeditions of the Brooke period.

== Background ==
Tensions in the Rajang region escalated after the killings of Brooke officers Charles James Fox and Henry Steele at Fort Emma in the town of Kanowit on 25 June 1859. The incident was viewed by the Brooke administration as a major challenge to its authority and contributed to calls for a substantial punitive mission upriver. The Fox and Steele killings were widely discussed in Brooke-era accounts and later scholarship as a turning point in Brooke - interior relations.

== Expedition ==
In 1863, Charles Brooke organised what anthropologist Peter Metcalf characterises as an unprecedented military campaign into the interior of Sarawak. Because the Brooke government lacked a formal standing army, the campaign depended almost entirely on these Iban allies for manpower and local logistical knowledge. Brooke claimed that he was able to summon approximately 15,000 allied Iban warriors, supported by only three other Europeans, a mobilization far larger than any previous force deployed under Brooke authority. According to later oral-historical accounts, preparations for the expedition began when Brooke traveled to Fort Lily in Betong where he convened prominent Iban leaders from the surrounding regions to begin assembling the force. From Betong, detachments of Iban allies from the Saribas, Skrang, and Padeh regions followed Brooke as the expedition moved toward the middle Rajang River and then ascended further into the interior. As the force advanced into areas identified at the time as inhabited by upriver Kayan communities, coordinated control proved increasingly difficult due to the sheer size and autonomy of the Iban war parties. Widespread raiding, burning of longhouses, and destruction of food stores and boats were reported across multiple settlements. Orally derived accounts later recorded in historical and museum publications describe how these attacks triggered successive upriver flights. Kayan groups withdrew first from the Kabah region, then to the upper Iran River, and later toward Belaga and adjacent highland areas. Each stage of retreat displaced additional communities, creating a cascading pattern of flight throughout the upper Rajang basin. The advancing Iban forces met little organised resistance after the earliest engagements, largely because many settlements had already been abandoned. Nevertheless, the destruction was extensive: wide stretches of the upper Rajang were left depopulated or in disarray, with empty longhouses and devastated food stores reported across multiple tributaries.

== Consequences ==
The campaign initiated a substantial movement of people in the interior. Metcalf describes the effect as a "chain reaction" in which refugees fled further inland, destabilizing communities as far as the highlands associated with the Sebop and other upriver groups. Accounts compiled in historical sources also describe the repeated retreat of upriver communities from Kabah, the Iran River, Belaga, and other locations during the aftermath of the conflict. These disruptions contributed to long-term shifts in the demographic distribution in the wider area, altering settlement patterns and inter-group relations throughout the upper Rajang basin.

== Legacy ==
The Great Kayan Expedition is regarded as one of the most dramatic upriver campaigns of the Brooke era. It demonstrated both the extent of Brooke influence—through the ability to mobilize large numbers of indigenous allies as well as the limits of administrative control over such forces. The expedition had enduring effects on interior communities and is frequently cited in studies of 19th-century Bornean warfare, migration, and governance.

== See also ==
- Expeditions of the White Rajahs of Sarawak
