= Fort Lingga =

Historic Brooke-era fort in Sarawak, Malaysia

- Kubu Lingga
- Lingga, Simanggang (modern-day Sri Aman), Sarawak, Malaysia

Site information
- Type: Brooke-era defensive fort
- Condition: No standing structure; surviving flagpole marks the site

Location
- Coordinates: 1.35465°N 111.17019°E

Site history
- Built: 1849
- Built by: James Brooke
- In use: 19th century
- Materials: Timber (Belian, Bornean ironwood)
- Fate: Demolished
- Battles/wars: Sadok Expedition (1861)

Garrison information
- Garrison: Malay and Iban auxiliaries
- Occupants: Brooke administration personnel

Fort Lingga (Malay: Kubu Lingga) is a historic Brooke‑era fort located in the Lingga area of Simanggang (present‑day Sri Aman), Sarawak, Malaysia. Built in 1849, it is one of the earliest forts constructed during the rule of the White Rajahs and forms part of the wider network of defensive and administrative structures established throughout the Raj of Sarawak.

== History ==
Fort Lingga was constructed in 1849 under the administration of the first White Rajah, James Brooke, as part of his strategy to consolidate control over upriver territories and quell regional resistance. It was supported in part by local Malay leaders, including Lela Pahlawan Abang Usin, who assisted in its establishment and defense. The fort later served as an operational hub during Brooke‑era military campaigns. Notably, it functioned as an overnight staging point during Charles Brooke’s 1861 Sadok Expedition, where allied Iban and Malay forces gathered before advancing toward the stronghold of Rentap at Bukit Sadok.

== Strategic Role ==
As with other Brooke‑era forts, Fort Lingga served several important functions:

- Military defense: Protecting nearby settlements from piracy and upriver conflict.
- Administrative center: Supporting the governing framework of the expanding Raj of Sarawak.
- Symbol of Brooke authority: Demonstrating the Rajahs' presence in newly pacified territories.

Aligned with the Brooke policy of establishing relatively uniform wooden forts across divisions, Fort Lingga exemplified typical fort construction of the era, often using durable Belian (Bornean ironwood, Eusideroxylon).

== Present Condition ==
Although many Sarawak forts have been preserved, restored, or adapted into museums, Fort Lingga itself no longer survives as a complete structure. According to heritage research, its only clearly visible remnant is a surviving flagpole marking its historical footprint.

== Significance ==
Fort Lingga forms part of the broader system of Brooke‑era forts that shaped Sarawak's administrative, military, and cultural landscape. These fortifications once served to maintain order, collect taxes, manage trade, and mediate relations with Indigenous communities. Over twenty such forts were built, and their historical legacy continues to be the subject of active academic research and heritage documentation.

== See also ==
- List of Forts constructed during the Raj of Sarawak
