= Expeditions of the White Rajahs of Sarawak =

Major military and punitive expeditions undertaken by the White Rajahs of Sarawak

The Expeditions of the White Rajahs of Sarawak were a series of military, punitive, and political campaigns carried out between the mid‑19th and early 20th centuries under the Brooke family, which ruled the independent Raj of Sarawak from 1841 to 1946. Led primarily by the first two rajahs, James Brooke and Charles Brooke, these expeditions played a decisive role in suppressing rebellions, curbing maritime raiding, asserting territorial control, and extending Sarawak’s authority. Together, they shaped the political, social, and geographic development of the state and marked the transition from Bruneian frontier province to a centralized Brooke‑governed polity.

== Suppression of the Sarawak Rebellion (1839–1841) ==
The future Rajah, James Brooke, assisted the Bruneian government in suppressing a local uprising in the Sarawak River region. Utilizing the superior firepower of his armed schooner, the Royalist, Brooke broke the protracted siege of the rebel stronghold at Lidah Tanah and mediated a surrender that spared the rebels' lives. As a reward for restoring order and resolving the conflict, Brooke was officially installed as the Rajah of Sarawak on 24 September 1841. This campaign marked the end of Bruneian administrative control over the Sarawak River region and established the foundation of the Brooke dynasty.

== Saribas Expedition (1843) ==
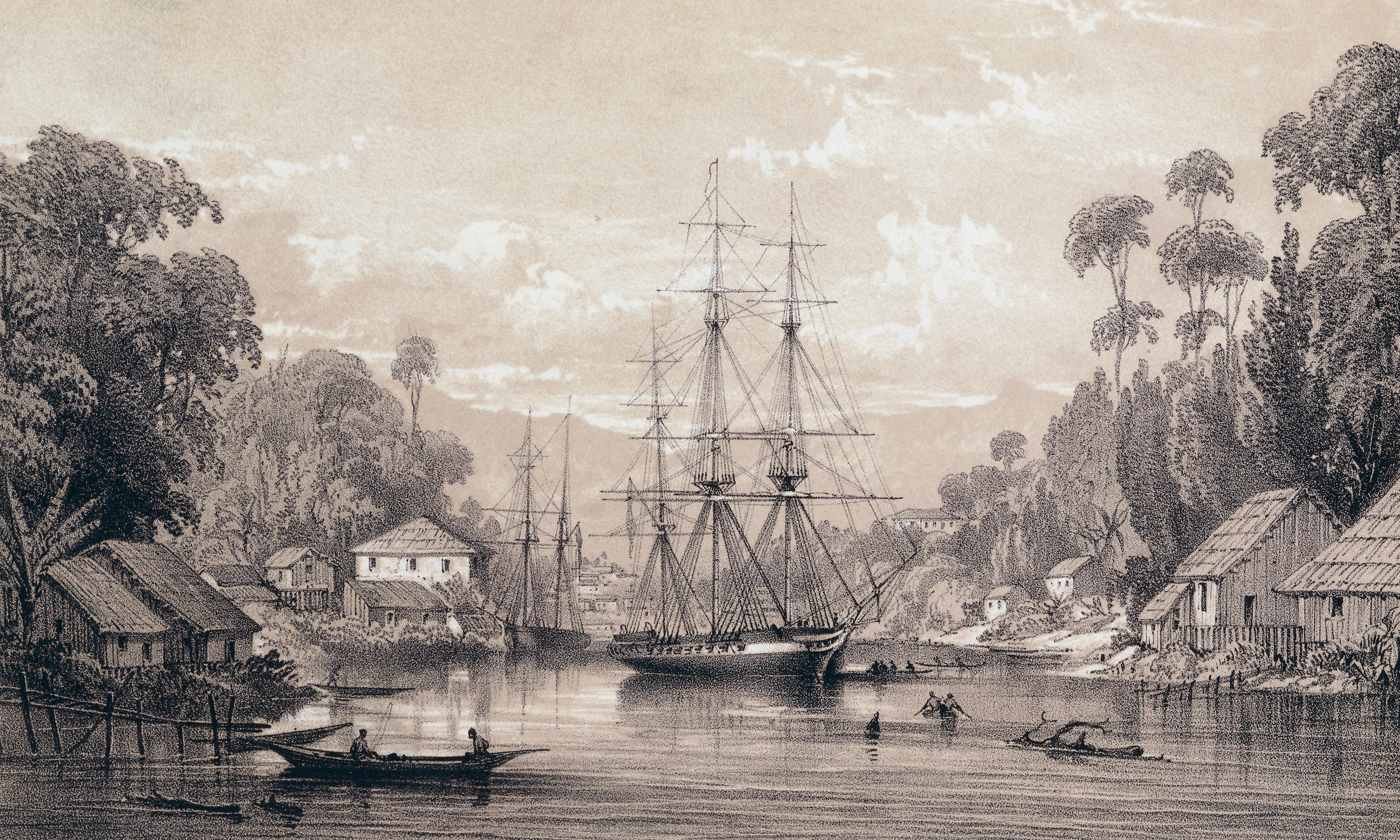
HMS Dido off the coast of Sarawak, Borneo, 1843.

The first major offensive launched by James Brooke, supported by Captain Henry Keppel and the HMS Dido, against the sea-raiding strongholds of the Saribas Iban. The naval force successfully navigated the river to destroy the heavily fortified stockades (Malay: "kubu") at Padi, Paku, and Rembas. This campaign was significant for introducing superior European naval artillery to the interior waterways of Sarawak, forcing local chiefs to temporarily submit to Brooke's authority. It established the template for future joint operations between the White Rajah and the British Royal Navy in the pacification of the region.

== Batang Lupar Expedition (1844) ==
James Brooke's pivotal military campaign targeted the strongholds of Sharif Sahap and the Skrang Dayaks to suppress regional piracy and resistance. It was supported by Captain Henry Keppel and the HMS Dido. While the mission successfully dismantled the fortifications at Patusan, it was marked by the death of the prominent Malay leader Datu Patinggi Ali during an ambush on the Skrang River. The campaign proved a turning point in Brooke’s administration, breaking the power of the coastal sharifs and highlighted the need for the construction of permanent riverine outposts ("Kubu" system). Ultimately, the expedition solidified the Rajah’s authority over the interior.

== Battle of Marudu Bay (1845) ==
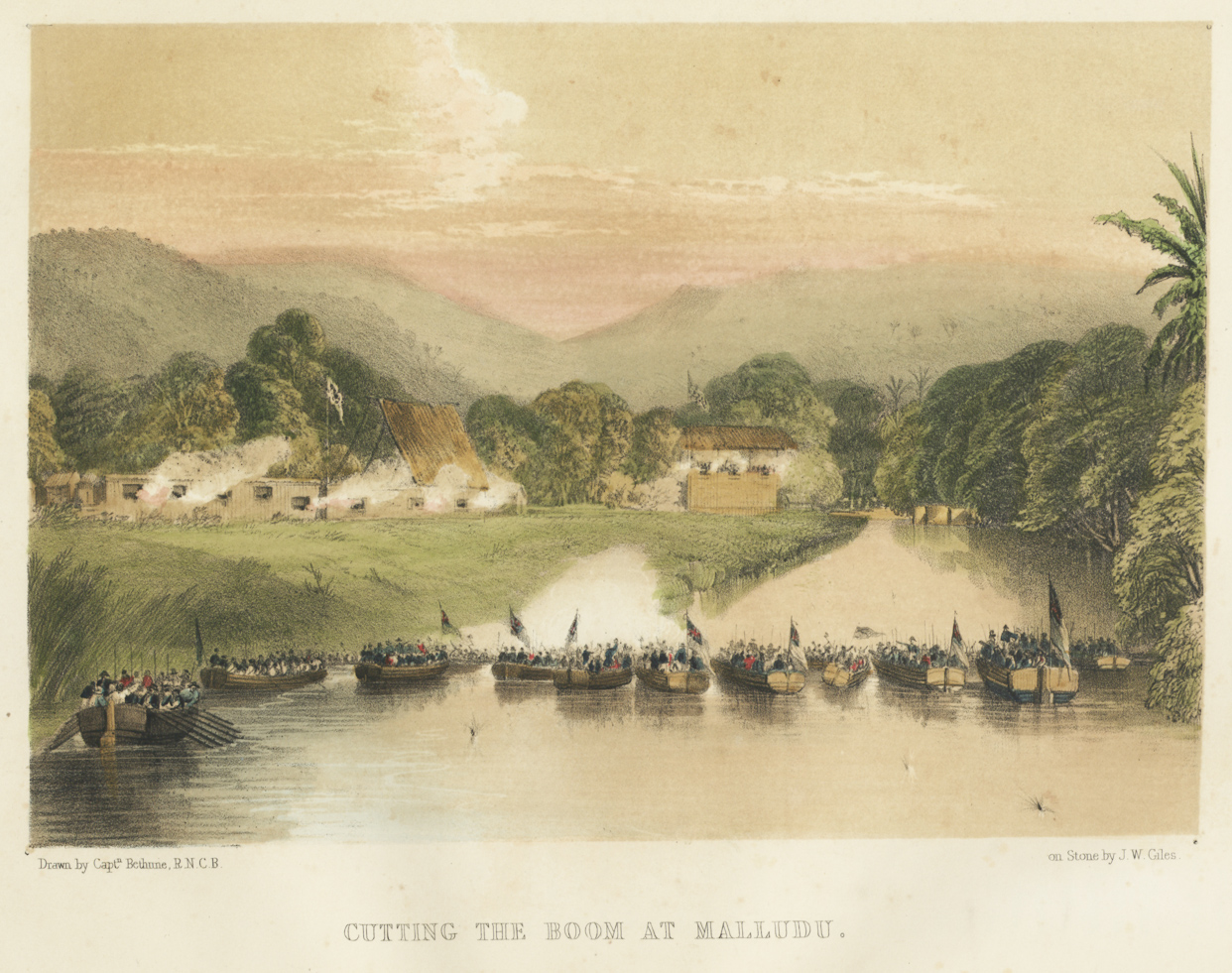
Thomas Cochrane's squadron attacks Syarif Osman at Marudu Bay, 19 August 1845.

A joint expedition of James Brooke and Royal Navy forces (led by Thomas Cochrane) defeated the fleet of the North Bornean leader Sharif Uthman at Marudu Bay, destroying his base and curbing regional maritime raiding.

== Attack on Brunei (1846) ==
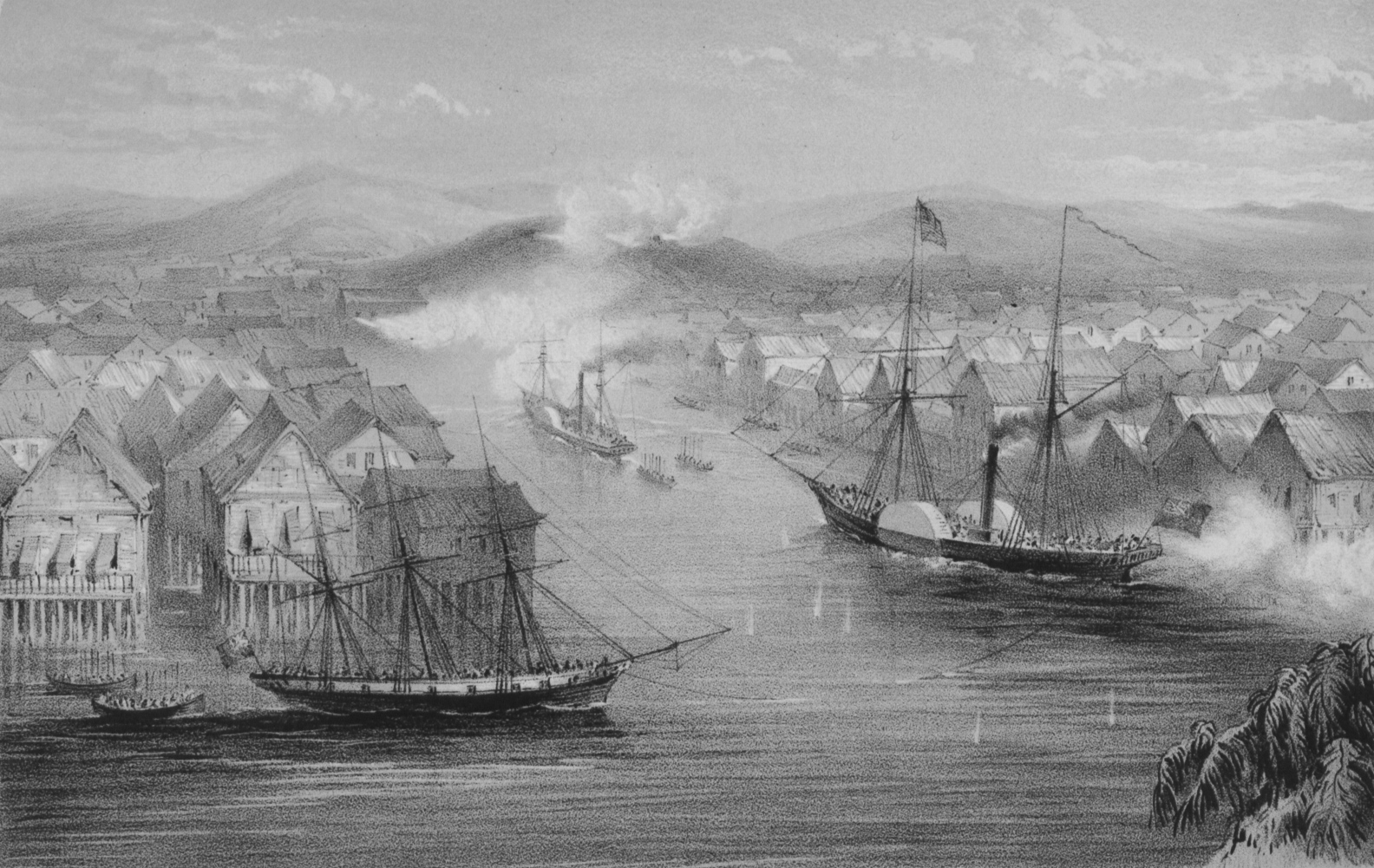
HEICS Phlegethon, HMS Spiteful, and HMS Royalist attack Brunei in July 1846.

After the murders of Bruneian nobles aligned with Brooke such as Pengiran Muda Hashim and his family, James Brooke launched an expedition with Royal Navy support (led by Thomas Cochrane) against Brunei. The capital was seized and the Sultan Omar Ali Saifuddin II compelled to cede Sarawak permanently to Brooke.

== Beting Maro Expedition (1849) ==
On 31 July 1849, James Brooke, with Malay, Dayak, and Royal Navy allies led by Captain Farquhar with Steamer Nemesis, defeated the followers of the Iban leader Linggir or Orang Kaya Pemancha Dana Bayang at Beting Maro, a sandbar off the coast near the mouth of the Batang Krian river and the town of Kabong, sinking numerous warboats and restraining upriver raiding activities in the Batang Lupar region. After the defeat, Orang Kaya Pemancha Dana Bayang agreed to surrender to Brooke and signed the Saribas Treaty in the same year. He presented a sungkit textile named lebur api to the Rajah Brooke

== Suppression of the Chinese (Bau) Rebellion (1857) ==
Around six hundred Hakka miners from Bau attacked Kuching. James and Charles Brooke led loyal Malays and Iban forces to retake the capital and eliminate remaining rebels.

== Bukit Sadok (Rentap) Expeditions (1857, 1858, 1861) ==
Charles Brooke led three major expeditions against the Iban leader Rentap. The first two (1857, 1858) failed; the third in 1861 succeeded in destroying Rentap’s fortress at Bukit Sadok, forcing his withdrawal into the interior.

== Skrang, Saribas, and Rajang Interior Expeditions (1850s–1870s) ==
Charles Brooke conducted multiple upriver campaigns aimed at suppressing inter‑tribal warfare, halting headhunting, and establishing fortified posts at the Lingga, Skrang, Kanowit, and other strategic rivers.

== Great Kayan Expedition (1863) ==
Charles Brooke led one of the largest and most far-reaching upriver campaigns of the Brooke era. Mobilizing a force of thousands of allied Iban warriors, the expedition advanced into the upper Rajang basin in response to earlier upriver resistance and the killing of Brooke officers in 1859. The campaign resulted in widespread destruction of settlements and a large-scale displacement of Kayan and other interior communities, triggering a chain of migrations further inland.

== Frontier Pacification Operations (Late 19th century) ==
A series of smaller punitive expeditions by Charles Brooke sought to consolidate control in remote regions and prevent renewed raiding among inland Dayak communities.

== Ulu Ai Expedition (1902) ==
Often referred to as the Cholera Expedition, this was a massive punitive campaign launched by Rajah Charles Brooke against the Iban of the upper Batang Lupar region led by the rebel chiefs Ngumbang and Bantin. Consisting of over 12,000 pro-government Dayak levies, the expedition was the largest mobilization in the history of the Raj, yet it ended in disaster before any military engagement occurred. A severe outbreak of cholera swept through the force at Pulau Seduku, resulting in the deaths of approximately 1,000 men and forcing an immediate abandonment of the mission. The failure of the 1902 expedition underscored the logistical risks of massive traditional mobilizations and temporarily emboldened resistance in the Sarawak interior.

== Gat and Mujong Expeditions (1914–1916) ==
The final major punitive campaigns conducted during the reign of Rajah Charles Brooke to suppress Iban resistance in the upper Rajang River basin.The conflict arose from the refusal of interior groups, led by figures such as Bantin, to adhere to government regulations regarding taxation and headhunting. Utilizing a massive force of loyalist volunteers and riverine steamers, the Rajah's forces successfully dismantled the rebel strongholds, resulting in the formal submission of the upper Rajang chiefs and the consolidation of administrative control over the interior borderlands.

== Asun Rebellion (1931–1933) ==
The last major indigenous uprising against the Brooke Raj, led by an Iban chief named Asun in the Kanowit and Entabai districts. Triggered by the introduction of stringent forest regulations and administrative taxes during the Great Depression, the movement was characterized by civil disobedience and guerrilla skirmishes rather than large-scale battles. The conflict ended with Asun's surrender and his subsequent exile to Lundu, marking the final pacification of the Sarawak interior under the White Rajahs.

== See also ==
- History of Sarawak
- Raj of Sarawak
- James Brooke
- Charles Brooke
- Rentap
