= Linggir =

19th-century Saribas Iban leader involved in Brooke-era campaigns

Linggir (also known as Mali Lebu) was a 19th‑century Iban leader from the Paku Valley in the Saribas region of what is now the Malaysian state of Sarawak. He is known primarily for his role in the mid‑nineteenth‑century conflicts and alliances that shaped relations between the Iban communities and the Brooke administration.

== Background ==
Linggir belonged to the Saribas Iban, one of the major riverine Iban groups of western Borneo during the era of the White Rajahs of Sarawak. During the early Brooke period, communities in the Saribas and Skrang river basins were frequently involved in coastal raiding and upriver warfare, which brought them into conflict with the expanding Brooke government.

== Role in Brooke-era Conflicts ==
By the 1850s, internal divisions emerged among Iban groups regarding whether to resist or cooperate with the Brooke administration. Although some Upper Skrang and Saribas groups followed leaders such as Rentap in resisting Brooke authority, others chose to ally with the government. Linggir became one of the most prominent Saribas Iban leaders to support the Brooke cause. He is recorded as taking part in allied Iban forces during Charles Brooke’s upriver campaigns. These forces were drawn from multiple regions, including the Lower Skrang and Saribas, and assisted Brooke in operations aimed at suppressing Iban groups opposed to his rule.

== Participation in Campaigns Against Rentap ==
Linggir and his followers joined the Brooke-aligned Iban contingents mobilized in the campaigns against the Upper Skrang fortifications of the Iban leader Rentap, particularly during the mid‑1850s operations that preceded the major assaults on Bukit Sadok. Although the initial expeditions of 1854 did not succeed in capturing Rentap, they laid the groundwork for later campaigns in which other Brooke‑allied Iban leaders, including those from Saribas and Skrang, played key roles in isolating Rentap's supporters and restricting their movement.

== Relations with Other Iban Leaders ==
Sources note that Linggir was one of several Iban leaders who cooperated closely with Charles Brooke during this period. Others included the Entanak chief Dana and his sons Aji, Luyoh, and Nanang. His alliance with these leaders and with Brooke indicates the pragmatic political choices made by some Iban communities seeking security, trade access, and autonomy under the new Sarawak administration.

== Legacy ==
While Linggir does not appear as prominently in later historical memory as Rentap or other major figures, his participation illustrates the complex network of alliances and rivalries within Iban society during the early formation of the Brooke state. His role also underscores how Iban leaders could become influential intermediaries in the shifting political landscape of the mid‑nineteenth century.

- 1. Dayang Laing x Abu Tinggang = Saliman
- 2. Saliman begot Semarugan
- 3. Semarugan begot Sera Gindi
- 4. Sera Gindi begot Sema Ugang
- 5. Sema Ugang begot Sera Gindam
- 6. Sera Gindam begot Sera Gindit
- 7. Sera Gindit begot Sera Gindah
- 8. Sera Gindah begot Merom Panggai
- 9. Merom Panggai begot Abang Musa
- 10. Abang Musa begot Pateh Simpong
- 11. Pateh Simpong begot Pateh Rejab
- 12. Pateh Rejab begot Pateh Rendah
- 13. Pateh Rendah begot Pateh Rasiek
- 14. Pateh Rasiek begot Pateh Ayu
- 15. Pateh Ayu begot Pateh Gurang & Dayang Patri
- 16. Pateh Gurang begot Pateh Sayat
- 17. Pateh Sayat begot Pateh Ismail
- 18. Pateh Ismail begot Pateh Sulaiman
- 19. Pateh Ismail begot Pateh Menaul
- 20. Pateh Menaul begot Pateh Menegir
- 21. Pateh Menegir begot Pateh Teliang
- 22. Pateh Teliang x Dayang Simba = Radin Tanjong
- 23. Radin Tanjong x Dayang Lungah = Pateh Ambau (found inside an egg inside a bamboo plant)
- 24. Pateh Ambau x Remias (Blangkat’s daughter) = Pateh Irie, Babang, Liang, Tubang, Ganggong
- 25. Pateh Iri x Nain = Nunong
- 26. Nunong x Lampai = Chaong
- 27. Chaong x Lantong = Tindin “Pimpin Bragah Ngindang”
- 28. Tindin x Tida = Rinda (f)
- 29. Rinda x Demong = Kelanang, Kelimbang, Bundak, Jawai (f), Bakak
- 30.1 Kelanang x Laus = Tuah
- 31.1 Tuah x Sarong = Sieng
- 32.1 Sieng x Laai = Busu
- 33.1 Busu x Jering = Uyut “Bedilang Besi”, Bremas (f), Menging (f), Rinda (f)
- 34.1 Uyut “Bedilang Besi” x Nangku = Pala (f), Entemang, Linggir, Empari, Sendai (f), Nisi (f), Cheremie (f)
- 35.11 Pala x Renggie I* = Kelanang, Saang, Janta, Jantin, Adir, Busu.
- 36.11 Kelanang x Empayung = Uyut II, Lanchang, Empiang & Leminang
- 37.11 Uyut II x Sawat (f) = Linggir “Mali Lebu”, Tambong (f), Renggie II
- 38.11 Linggir “Mali Lebu” x Anong = Umang (f), Kinyeh
- 39.11 Umang x Garran “Lembang Batu” = Uyut III, Libau, Kerbau, Tupang (f), Attat
- 40.11 Attat x Inddu (f) = Benedict Sandin, Lentie (f), L.F.Mawar, Gerinching (f)
- 41.11 Benedict Sandin x Evelyn Lemok(f) = Umang (f) David Betram Panggau, Henry Andrew Ibbie, Edmund Stanley Jugol
- 42.1 Umang (f) x Edmund – Cherembang, Libau
- 42.2 David Betram Panggau x Rinya = Patrick Giring, Diana Uti, Linda Tupang, Keling Luyoh, Genevie, Edward Saga
- 42.3 Henry Andrew Ibbie x Margaret Bugak = John Kantan, Elizabeth Nawie
- 42.4 Edmund Stanley Jugol x Betty Munji – Runya, Dayrel Walter Entrie, Colin Uyut, Melissa Anne Inddu

Note : Cii.24 Pateh Ambau was the son of Radin Tanjong & Dayang Lungah. He was found by Radin Tanjong while he was clearing an area of bamboo plants when he heard a cry from inside of one of a huge bamboo plant. The bamboo was brought home to his wife who later discovered a big egg inside and from where Pateh Ambau was born. He married Remias (first cousin of Sarapoh & War Lord Keling), a descendant of Beji Nangga Hari Patah Titi Enchepong Purang. Pateh Ambau was later to be the first Iban pioneer who came from the Kapuas River and settle at Pangkalan Tabau above Lubok Antu in the Batang Ai, Second Division, Sarawak. Cii.26 Nunong settled and died in the Batang Ai. Cii.27 Chief Chaong, a war leader, migrated from the Batang Ai to Nanga Enteban in Skrang districtand died there. Cii.28 Chief Tindin “Pimpin Bragah Ngindang”, a Skrang war leader, migrated to the Paku region following his daughter Rinda’s marriage to Demong, son a Baketan Chief Entingi “Keti Aur Tulang”. Chief Tindin died and was buried at Nanga Beduru, the first Iban cemetry in Paku. Tida, wife of Tindin, was a grand-daughter of Guang and Sendie. Sendie ancestors were as follows: Jelenggai x Bunsu Bintang Banyak = Selamuda x Dayang Manis Muka = Begeri x Senia = Busok “Tandok Raja” x Singgau (f) = Mai Apai Rekaya, Sendie x Guang = Lanchap x Judi (f) = Tida (f), Tair, Tingkat. Guang was a Skrang widower who married Sendie (also a widow) who were told by Kumang to marry each other in their dreams. Sendie came all the way from Sebuyau by boat paddled by 8 slaves to marry him. Sendie first husband, Gelungan, was a brave war leader. After all his warriors were defeated in the hands of the enemy, he went straight to the enemy and demanded that they fight him until he is dead because he said that he cannot go on living without his trusted warriors. Tida is also 2nd cousin of Patinggi Ngadan (son of Patinggi Gurang & 1st cousin of Lanchap). Cii.29 Demong is the son of a Paku Baketan Tribe Chief named Entinggi “Keti Aur Tulang”. Their genealogy is as follows: Sebatin = Derom ke datai ari segum gigi gumbang = *Senaun, Sabungkok x Lemina = **Dayang Ilam (f), Jugo x ? = Entinggi “Keti Aur Tulang” x Dayun = Demong.

- Senaun begot Tugau and became the ancestor of the Melanau race.
  - Dayang Ilam x Semalanjat = Kerbu “Pematu Jala Jarang” x Dayang Umah Dara Manah Ditatah Bangkang came from Pinang Mirah Menyala Takang = Umar Kapar Bubu Batang x Dayang Kuyan = Umbar from Tg. Pagar, Batang Ai x Dayang Laing Lunchik Juring Geman Pejerantang = Medan of Meruan Sengkarong Langkang x Nantai = Entalang Bujang x ? = Tamoh, Ranchak, Judi.

Entalang Bujang was killed by a Kantu man named Jalang. After Entalang’s death, his father Medan asked his slave named Lunsur to kill Jalang. After Jalang was killed by Lusur, Medan then arranged for Lusur to marry his anak umbong named Tamoh. But the marriage did not last long. They divorced shortly and Tamoh married a man named Usik and begot a daughter named Simpu who was married to a man named Pantau and begot a daughter named Ulas Indu Badas Bepantak Subang. Ulas begot Meringai x Randai (f) Indu Pandai Batang Srang. Cii.30.1 Kelanang (son of Demong vs Rinda) and his brothers were the Iban leaders who cleared the lower Paku land for agriculture purposes. Cii.31.2 Berayun was a bachelor aristocrat who quarrelled with one Janang over their sweetheart, Bremas, who later married Berayun. After this quarrell, Janang migrated to Sebuyau from where he attacked Brayun’s house at Ulu Samu with his Sebuyau warriors. That house was burnt to the ground and was made a cemetery called “Penuan Abis” to this day. Cii.33.1 Chief Busu was a well known Chief who led his followers to clear the lands on the true left of the Paku River banks from Nanga Beduru to Nanga Anyut. It was at this time that Chief Saang came from the Layar and settled at Emperan Medang on the true right bank of Paku River and later became the Chief of Lower Paku. Cii.33.2 Libau (Kanang) and his family migrated from Skrang. His father Nyaru attacked the Ulu Paku Baketan at Nanga Gelu, Penom. Cii.34.1 Chief Uyut “Bedilang Besi”, the only son of Chief Busu, married Nangku, the eldest daughter of Chief Saang of lower Paku and succeeded him as Chief of Lower Paku when the later died. Chief Uyut was the bravest war leader of his time. Due to his bravery and the bravery of his sons and son-in-laws in wars, Chief Uyut commended that the Holy Wine (Ai Jalong Timang) at Gawai Antu festival could only be drank after it has been blessed by the barbs with their Timang Jalong Song. This method is still followed today. Cii.35.1 Renggie I was the grandson of Chief and war leader Jantin “Moahari”. He married Chief Uyut’s daughter, Pala. On his wedding, Chief Uyut demanded a hugh sum as dowry for the marriage. After the death of Chief Uyut, Renggie succeeded him as Chief of Lower Paku and Anyut tributary. Cii.36.11 Chief Kelanang (son of Renggie vs Pala) was a war leader who was always at odds with the Brunei Officials who gathered padi from the Iban as yearly door tax. It was from his time that revolt against the Brunei regime started in the Saribas River. Cii.37.11 Chief Uyut II became Chief in succession of his father Chief Kelanang. With his cousin, Adir “Bungkok”, he became very friendly with the Malay Chief, Datuk Patinggi Kedit and his son Datuk Laksamana Amir. Due to this amicable deplomatic relationship, Chief Uyut II and his warriors fought alongside the followers of Datuk Laksamana Amir against their enemies around the mouth of Rajang Delta for many decades. Chief Uyut died of old age in about 1845. Cii.38.11 Chief Linggir “Mali Lebu” was the most notorious and well known war leader in Saribas in succession of his father. “Mali Lebu” means never fail i.e. unthinkable to do anything in vain. It is an epithet of men consistently successful in war. In his early days, he followed and learn how to be a Chief and war leader from other Senior war leaders in the Saribas and Skrang regions. With Chief OKP Dana Bayang of Padeh and Chief Unal Bulan of Ulu Layar they formed the most illustrious and formidable alliance in the history of Saribas. Led by Chief OKP Dana “Bayang” (the most senior and experienced war leader among three of them) they attacked and captured Undup Region which was the nest of the notorious Undup Ibans who frequently attacked and killed the Skrang People. Chief Linggir “Mali Lebu” most famous raids were leading the Paku and Skrang warriors in capturing the Bugau Dayak’s fortress in Ulu Ketungau, the upper reaches of Undup River. His other raids were against the Baketan at Sugai in the Julau region, against the enemy at Paloh, attacked the Melanaus at Illas near mouth of Igan Delta and against Mato Daro. He was ambush by Rajah James Brooke and Captain Henry Keppel at the famous Battle of Beting Maru on 31 July 1849 his return from leading the Saribas and Skrang Warriors raiding the coastal areas in the mouth of Rajang river. He and his Saribas Iban & Malay Warriors escaped destruction from the onslaught of the Rajah forces and returned to Paku by overland route from Kabong. He and his warriors arrived in time to organise a defense of his longhouse in Krangan Pinggai from the advancing Rajah Flotalia on 3 August 1849, three days after the battle of Beting Maru. He laid an ambush and attacked the Rajah’s advancing forces down river at Nanga Peka. In this Battle at Nanga Peka, he and his warrior Kedit “Rindang” killed Tujang and Bunsi, the warrior sons of Chief OK Jugah of Lundu who came with the Rajah forces. Five years later in 1854, he made official submission to Brooke Rule. He and his warriors helped the Rajah’s forces to fight against the Kayan in the Upper Rajang in 1861 & 1863, and against the Katibas rebels led by Unjop, the brother of Chief Balang. Chief Linggir “Mali Lebu” died in 1874 of old age. He was succeeded by his son-in-law cum nephew Penghulu Garan “Lembang Batu”. Cii.39.11 Penghulu Garan “Lembang Batu” (son of Chabu vs Tambong, who is also Linggir’s sister) succeeded Chief Linggir in 1875. Garan himself was a war leader who led his warriors to attack the rebels at Sut in Balleh and Ibau tributary of the Rajang. The first war he led was against the Maloh Dayaks in the Labuyan territory of Kalimantan Barat in the late 1860s. He died on 23 July, 1900 and was succeeded by his brother-in-law, Penghulu Kinyeh of Beduru, Paku in 1901 but died in that same year of his succession. Penghulu Kinyeh was also an adopted son of Chief Linggir. Uyut III “Muntigerai” was the eldest son of Penghulu Garan “Lembang Batu”. He joined the Malayan Constabulary in the late 1880s and was promoted to the rank of Corporal in the force. He helped to fight the rebels in state of Pahang and Trengganu for ten years. He is also the father of the current Penghulu Lawrence Sanggat of Tanjong Paku. Cii.37.22 Sumbang “Matahari” was a brave warrior under Chief Linggir “Mali Lebu” of Paku. He killed an enemy at Ilas, and another when Chief Linggir attacked the Baketan at Sugai, Julau in 1854. His son Guroh was a war leader in succession of Nakhoda Tinggie at Ranau, Sabah and Jugol was Nakhoda Tinggie’s leading warrior. Lemok (#31.22) was the mother of Jungan who led trading to Sabah. Jungan’s brother, Jantin, was killed in the Mat Salleh war.

== See also ==
- Iban people
- White Rajahs
- Rentap
