= List of Forts constructed during the Raj of Sarawak =

The following is a list of forts constructed across the territory of the Raj of Sarawak during the period of Brooke rule (1841–1946). Forts played a central role in the administration, defense, and expansion of the Raj, serving simultaneously as military posts, government offices, symbols of authority, and centers of local administration. The Sarawak Tourism Board notes that the Brookes built more than twenty forts across the country,; state reporting in 2025 stated that twenty‑three forts once existed, with fourteen still standing.

== List of forts ==
=== 1840s ===
- Fort Lingga (Simanggang); built 1849.
- Fort James (Skrang); built before 1864; materials later reused for Fort Alice in Sri Aman.

=== 1850s ===
- Fort Sarikei (Sarikei); built 1850.
- Fort Leonora (Engkilili); built 1850.
- Fort Lily (Betong); originally known as Fort Betong; built 1858; later renamed for Margaret Alice Lili de Windt.
- Fort Emma (Kanowit); built 1859; named after Emma Frances Brooke.

=== 1860s ===
- Fort Brooke (Sibu); built 1862; demolished in 1936.
- Fort Keppel (Bintulu); built 1862; named for Sir Henry Keppel; destroyed during World War II.
- Fort Alice (Simanggang); built 1864; named after Margaret Alice Lili de Windt.

=== 1870s ===
- Fort Baleh (confluence of Rajang and Baleh Rivers); built 1875.
- Fort Limbang (Limbang); built 1879.
- Fort Charles (Kabong); built 1878; rebuilt after collapse in 1893.
- Fort Margherita (Kuching); built 1879; named for Margaret Alice Lili de Windt.

=== 1880s ===
- Fort Sylvia (Kapit); built 1880; named after Sylvia Brett.
- Fort Vyner (Belaga); built 1884; named for Charles Vyner Brooke.
- Fort Florence (Trusan), built 1887; named for Florence Brooke.
- Fort Ranee (Saratok), built 1888.

=== 1890s ===
- Fort Hose (Marudi); built 1898; named after Charles Hose.

=== 1910s ===
- Fort Burdett (Mukah); built 1911.
- Fort Lio Matu (Baram); built 1911.
- Fort Arundell (Lubok Antu); built 1912 (varying sources); named after resident Gilbert Roger Harris Arundell.

=== 1920s ===
- Fort Long Akah (Long Akah); built 1929.

=== 1930s ===
- Fort Brooke (Julau); built 1862; demolished in 1936.

== See also ==
- Raj of Sarawak
- White Rajahs
- James Brooke
- History of Sarawak
