= Fort Emma =

- Kubu Emma
- Kanowit, Sarawak, Malaysia
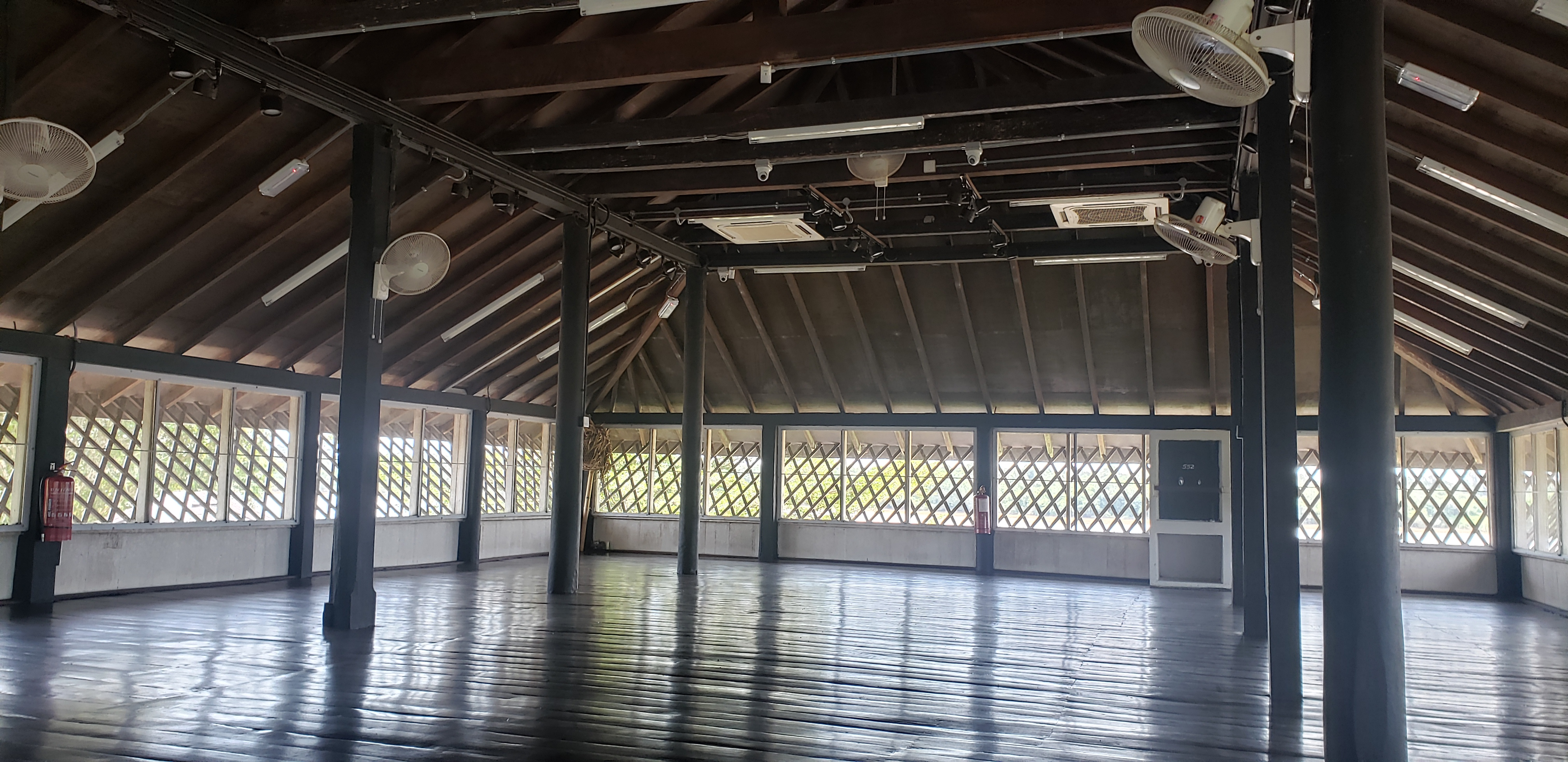
- Inside of the upper floor of Fort Emma

Site information
- Type: Defensive fort
- Owner: Sarawak Museum Department
- Open to the public: Yes
- Condition: Restored

Location
- Coordinates: 2.101628°N 112.158100°E

Site history
- Built: 1860
- Built by: Brooke Government
- Materials: Belian (Bornean ironwood)

Fort Emma (Malay: Kubu Emma, Chinese: 爱玛堡) is a historic wooden fort in Kanowit, Sarawak, Malaysia. Constructed during the era of the Brooke dynasty, it served as a defensive outpost and administrative center on the banks of the Rajang River. The fort is named after Emma Brooke, the sister of Rajah James Brooke.

== Etymology ==
The Malay name of the fort, Kubu Emma, combines the word "kubu" - a Malay term meaning "fort", "stockade", or "defensive structure" - with "Emma" referring to Emma Frances Brooke (1802–1870), the elder sister of Rajah James Brooke and the mother of Charles Brooke, the second Rajah of Sarawak. In Chinese-language sources, the fort is referred to as 爱玛堡 (Àimǎ bǎo), a direct transliteration of "Emma" combined with the character "堡", meaning "fort" or "stronghold".

== History ==
The earliest fortification at Kanowit was constructed in 1849 on a site near the mouth of the Kanowit River that is in the present time occupied by the Tua Pek Kong Chinese temple (Chinese: 大伯公庙; pinyin: Dàbógōng Miào). The first structure was known as Fort Betong since it was built using Betong bamboo. The structure featured a nipah palm roof and was demolished later the same year. A second fort, known as Fort Kanowit (Kubu Kanowit), was built in 1851 on a hill facing the Rajang River. On June 25, 1859, the fort became the site of the last major challenge to Brooke rule following the killings of Charles James Fox and Henry Steele, two officers working for the Brooke government. The killings contributed to the Great Kayan Expedition of 1863 and the expansion of the Rajah's power into the Rajang valley and delta as well as the coastal region around the towns of Mukah and Oya. In 1860, a more permanent two‑storey structure was erected and named Fort Emma after Emily Brooke. Fort Emma also served as a defensive position against Iban raiding parties from the Ulu Batang Rajang region. The fort remained an important stronghold for the government of the Booke family until the Japanese occupation in 1941/1942. Around 1949, Fort Emma was adapted for use as the administrative office of the Kanowit Sea Dayak Local Authority, established that same year. The authority was renamed the Kanowit District Council in 1957 and moved its administrative centre to a new building opposite the fort in 1967.

== Architecture ==
Fort Emma is primarily constructed of belian (Eusideroxylon zwageri), or Bornean ironwood, noted for its durability in tropical conditions.

The fort historically included:

- An elevated belian‑timber superstructure
- An uncemented ground floor used as detention cells
- Administrative offices on the first floor
- Residential quarters on the top floor
- Auxiliary structures including a crocodile shed, later relocated during conservation work

The ground floor, originally uncemented, served as prison cells guarded by Sikh guards and the Sarawak Rangers. Offices occupied the first floor, while the upper floor housed residential quarters for officials and visiting dignitaries, including the Rajah.

A restoration undertaken in the 1960s replaced much of the external walling and repainted the structure, significantly changing its appearance.

== Conservation ==
A major conservation project led by the Sarawak Museum Department took place between June 2018 and December 2019. The work included repairs to structural flooring, columns, staircases, walls, ceilings, and roofing, along with the relocation of the historic crocodile shed.

An Archaeological Impact Assessment (AIA) conducted in 2019 recovered ceramics, glass, metal objects, earthenware, and other artifacts, helping reconstruct the fort's mid‑19th‑century chronology. The survey also identified foundation levels at no more than 0.6 meters deep.

== See also ==
- List of Forts constructed during the Raj of Sarawak
