= Fort Alice =

Former fort in Kuching, Sarawak, Malaysia

Fort Alice (1864)
- Kubu Alice
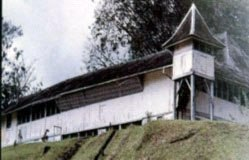
- Interactive map of the Fort Alice (1864) area

General information
- Type: fort
- Location: Simanggang, Sarawak, Malaysia
- Coordinates: 1°14′23.1″N 111°27′42.8″E
- Completed: 1864
- Opening: 18 April 2015
- Cost: MYR5 million

The Fort Alice (Malay: Kubu Alice) is a fort in Simanggang, Sarawak, Malaysia.

== Name ==
This historic fort is named after Margaret Alice Lili de Windt, wife of Charles Brooke. It was built in 1864 by the second White Rajah of Sarawak, and is one of the oldest and most significant surviving forts from the Brooke dynasty era. The fort played a crucial role in defending the Brooke government's interests and maintaining peace in the region, particularly against the Iban.

== History ==
The area around Simanggang and the Batang Lupar river system was strategically important for the Brooke government due to its position as a major waterway into the interior of Sarawak. The history of forts in this region prior to Fort Alice is a sequence of constructions and reconstructions.

The first government fort built by the Brookes in the area was Fort Sakarran, built in Dec 1849 on orders of the first White Rajah, James Brooke, across from Nanga Skrang (the mouth of the Skrang River). This fort served as an early outpost to control the movement and trade of the Iban of the Skrang and Batang Lupar rivers. However, in 1856, the floor of Fort Sakarran collapsed and the fort was redesigned and rebuilt in the same year by Charles Brooke, Rajah of Sarawak, who was then the Tuan Muda. This rebuilt structure was subsequently named Fort James, in honour of the first White Rajah.

Despite the reconstruction, Fort James, still located across from Nanga Skrang, often suffered from perennial flooding due to its location. Recognising the need for a more robust and permanent structure on higher ground, Charles Brooke ordered its relocation to Simanggang. Completed in 1864, this new fort was built on an elevated site, making it less susceptible to floods. Initially, this structure was simply referred to as "the new fort at Simanggang" or "Fort Simanggang."

The fort was later officially named Fort Alice. While the exact date of its renaming is not definitively documented, it is widely believed to have been named in honour of Margaret Alice Lili de Windt, who became the wife of Sir Charles Anthoni Johnson Brooke in 1869. This naming convention was consistent with other forts built by the Brooke dynasty, such as Fort Margherita in Kuching, and Fort Lily in Betong, which were also named after Ranee Margaret.

Fort Alice served as a key administrative and defensive outpost. Once Sarawak was divided into districts in 1873, it housed the second district's Resident's office, the court, and a small garrison of soldiers. Its strategic location allowed the Brooke government to monitor riverine traffic, suppress piracy, and control the movements of hostile groups. The fort was particularly instrumental in the prosecution of pacification campaigns.

The fort was listed as historical monument by the Sarawak State Government in 1971. In June 2013, restoration works began on the fort and was completed on 18 April 2015 with a cost of MYR5 million. It was then reopened as the Sri Aman Heritage Museum.

~ Old tradition in Fort Alice (1864-1964)

This was the evening call at eight o'clock for hundred year, when the Resident used to have his dinner and the draw- bridge was drawn up for the night. It was a call made by a policeman after he had struck the eight o'clock gong.

The call was changed slightly twice over the years but the meaning remained almost the same.

The Call (in Iban)
Oh Ha! Oh Ha! Oh Ha!
Jam diatu pukol lapan,
Tangga udah di-tarit,
Pintu udah di-tambit,
Orang ari ulu,
Orang ari ili,
Nadai tahu niki kubu agi.

Translation
Oh Ha! Oh Ha! Oh Ha!
The time is now eight o'clock,
The steps have been drawn up,
The door is closed.
People from up-river,
People from down-river,
Are not allowed to come up to the fort any more.

== Architecture ==
The two storey rectangular fort is constructed of belian wood, known for its extreme durability and resistance to rot and insect infestation. The fort features thick walls, loop-holes for firearms, and a commanding view of the river. Its design reflects the practical needs of colonial defense, prioritizing strength and functionality over elaborate aesthetics. It is equipped with cannons, open courtyard, drawbridge and a distinctive feature of Brooke-era forts like Fort Alice is often an elevated platform or tower, allowing for better surveillance of the surrounding area.

The interior of the fort historically contained various rooms for the Resident's quarters, offices for administrative staff, a lock-up for prisoners, and storage facilities.

== Present Day ==
Fort Alice has undergone several renovations and restorations over the years to preserve its historical integrity. It stands today as a significant landmark in Simanggang and a tangible reminder of Sarawak's colonial past under the Brooke dynasty.

In recent years, there have been efforts to transform Fort Alice into a heritage centre or museum, aiming to showcase the history of the Brooke era in Simanggang and the broader region. It serves as an important educational resource for understanding the social, political, and cultural dynamics of 19th and early 20th century Sarawak.

== See also ==
- List of Forts constructed during the Raj of Sarawak
- List of tourist attractions in Malaysia
