= Fort Lily =

Fort in Sarawak, Malaysia

Coordinates: 1°24′52″N 111°31′41″E

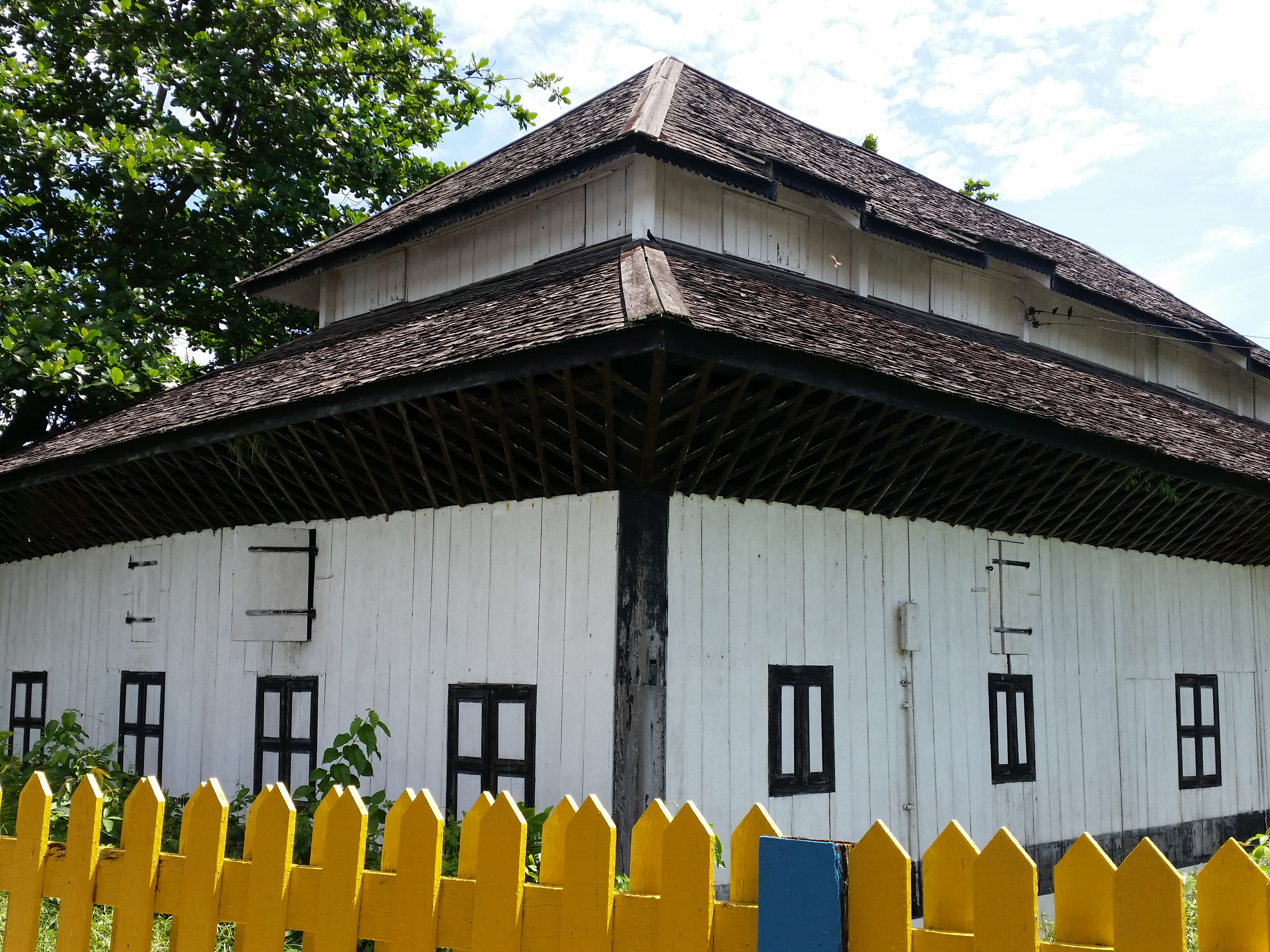
- Interactive map of the Fort Lily area

General information
- Location: Jalan Datuk Patinggi Udin, Betong, Sarawak, Malaysia
- Completed: 1858
- Owner: Government of Sarawak

Technical details
- Material: Belian timber

Fort Lily (Fort Lili) is a historical fort in Betong, Sarawak, Malaysia. It was built in 1858 by James Brooke, Rajah of Sarawak, as a defence centre and to safeguard government activities in the area.

== History ==
The fort, the oldest in Sarawak, is located in the town of Betong in the Betong Division, Sarawak, and was built in 1858 by James Brooke, the first Rajah of Sarawak, as a government administrative centre and to provide protection from attacks by Iban warriors led by Rentap. The fort was originally known as Fort Betong, but was later renamed Fort Lili (often anglicized as Fort Lily after Margaret Alice Lili de Windt, the wife of the second Rajah of Sarawak. This makes it one of three forts named after Margaret Alice Lili de Windt - the other two being Fort Margherita and Fort Alice. Later, it was used as a police station and as government offices, before it became vacant.

== Description ==
The fort is made entirely of wood using belian timber. The original nipah leaf roof has been replaced with a roof of belian shingles.

In 2019, it was reported that the building would be converted into a museum by the Sarawak Museum Department to display cultural artefacts of the Iban people.

== See also ==
- List of Forts constructed during the Raj of Sarawak
