= HMS Dido (1836) =

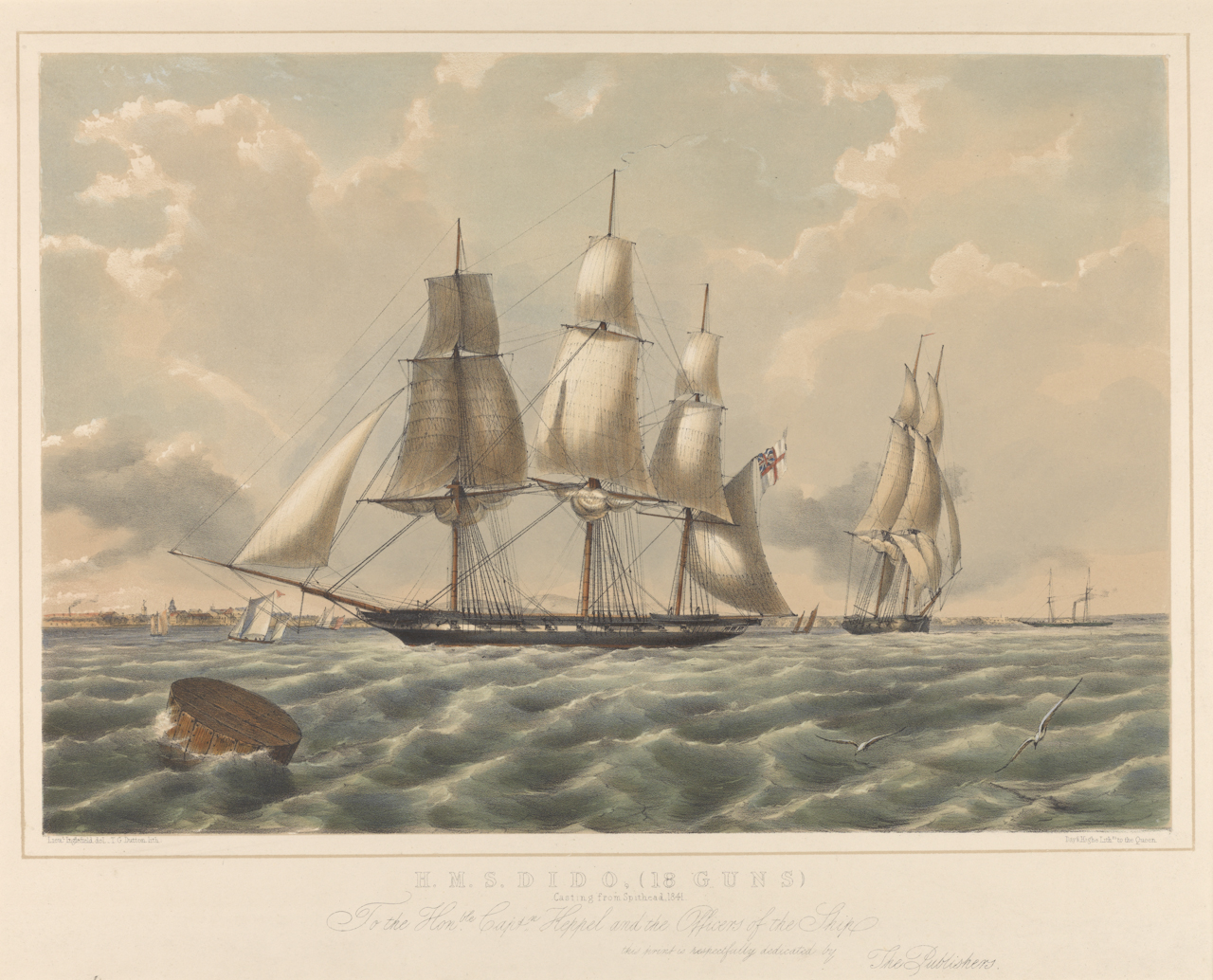
- HMS Dido at Spithead 1841

History

United Kingdom
- Name: Dido
- Namesake: Dido
- Ordered: 26 February 1834
- Builder: Pembroke Dockyard
- Laid down: September 1834
- Launched: 13 June 1836
- Completed: 26 January 1837
- Commissioned: 25 October 1836
- Fate: Sold for scrap, 3 March 1903

General characteristics
- Class & type: Daphne-class corvette
- Tons burthen: 734 10/94 bm
- Length: 120 ft (36.6 m) (gundeck); 99 ft (30.2 m) (keel)
- Beam: 37 ft 8 in (11.5 m)
- Draught: 14 ft 4 in (4.4 m)
- Depth: 18 ft (5.5 m)
- Complement: 145
- Armament: 18 × 32-pdr cannon

HMS Dido was an 18-gun Daphne-class corvette built for the Royal Navy during the 1830s.

== Description ==
Dido had a length at the gundeck of 120 feet (36.6 m) and 99 feet (30.2 m) at the keel. She had a beam of 37 feet 8 inches (11.5 m), a draught of 14 ft 6 in (4.4 m) and a depth of hold of 18 feet (5.5 m). The ship's tonnage was 734 10/94 tons burthen. The Daphne class was armed with eighteen 32-pounder cannon. The ships had a crew of 145 officers and ratings that later increased to 175.

== Construction and career ==
Dido, the second ship of her name to serve in the Royal Navy, was ordered on 26 February 1834, Designed by Symonds, laid down in September 1834 at Pembroke Dockyard, Wales, and launched on 13 June 1836. She was completed on 26 January 1837 at Sheerness Dockyard and commissioned on 25 October 1836.

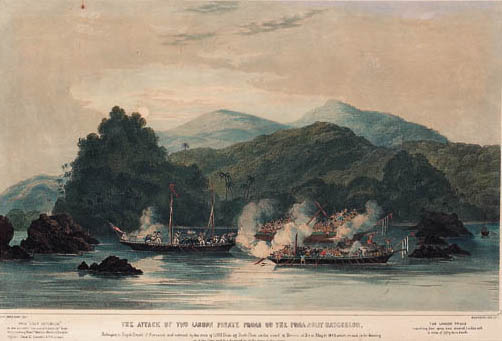
Attack of two Lanoon pirate proas on the proa Jolly Batchelor

In May 1843 Dido's crew were manning the proa Jolly Batchelor, which belonged to Rajah Brooke of Sarawak, when they were attacked by two Lanoon pirate proas off Datto Point, Borneo at 3 am. The encounter ended in the destruction of one proa and the elimination of the crew of the other.

Dido arrived at Auckland, New Zealand from the East Indies Station on 2 June 1847.

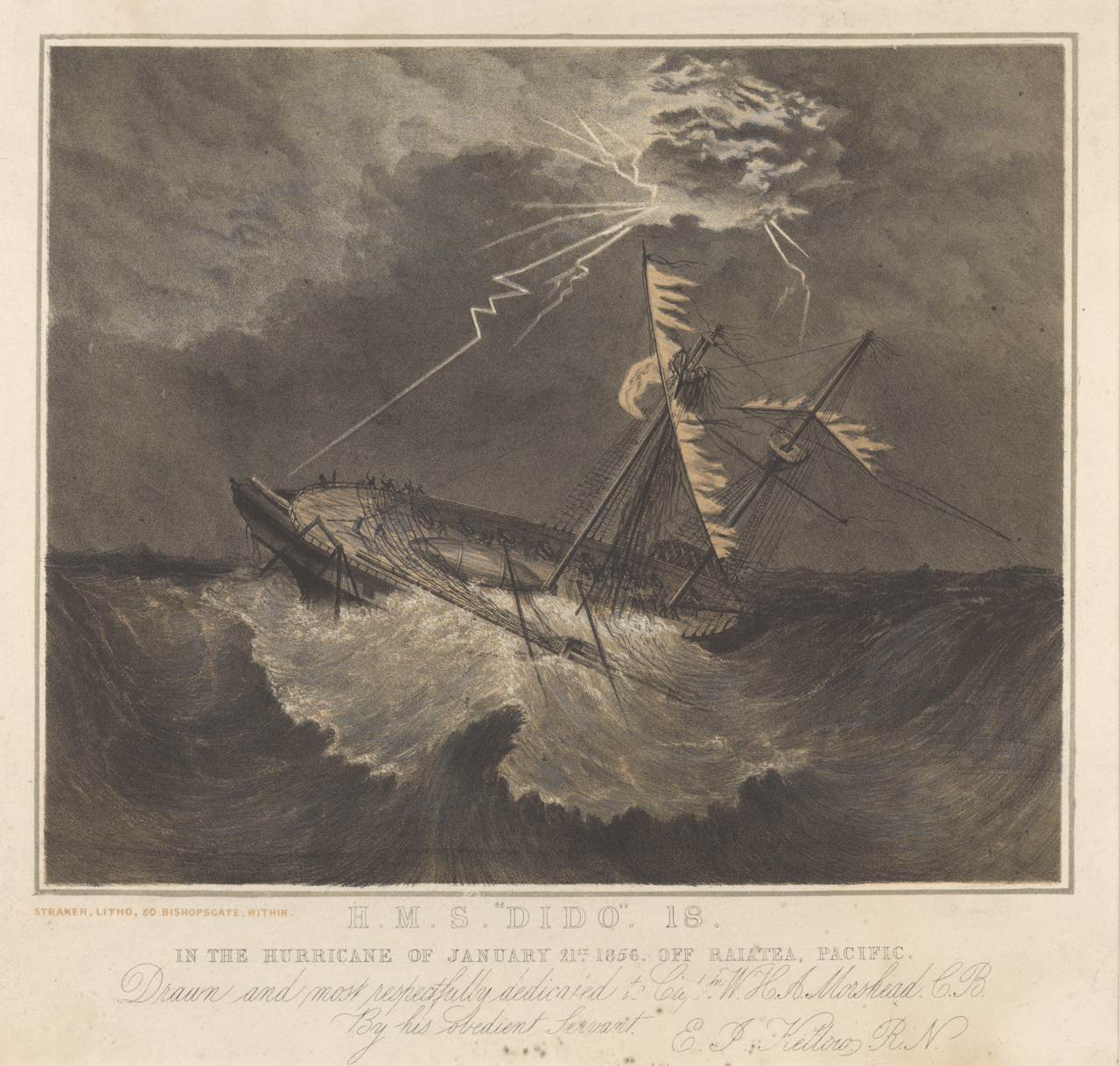
Dido, in the hurricane of 21 January 1856 off Raiatea, Pacific

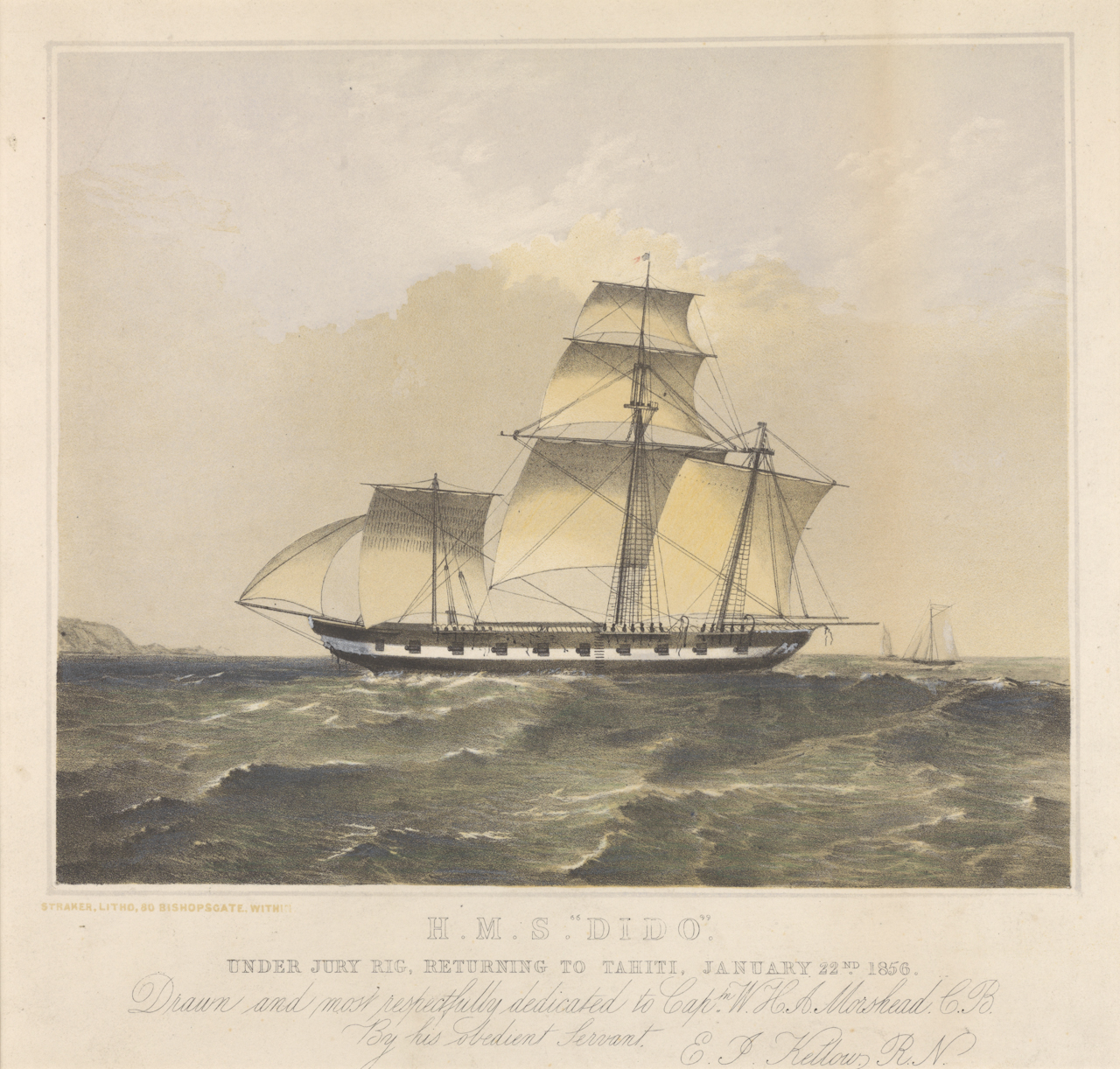
Dido, under jury rig, returning to Tahiti on 22 January 1856

She took part in Syrian war of 1840 and Chinese war of 1842. On 9 April 1852, she ran aground on the Wellsbank, off Callao, Peru. On 28 July 1852, she ran aground off Tahiti, damaging her forefoot and keel. She was ordered back to England for repairs. In Pacific 1855. She was used as a coal hulk after 1860, at Sheerness and was sold in 1903.

== See also ==
Expeditions of the White Rajahs of Sarawak
