= Betong, Sarawak =

Town in Malaysia

Betong
- Town and district capital
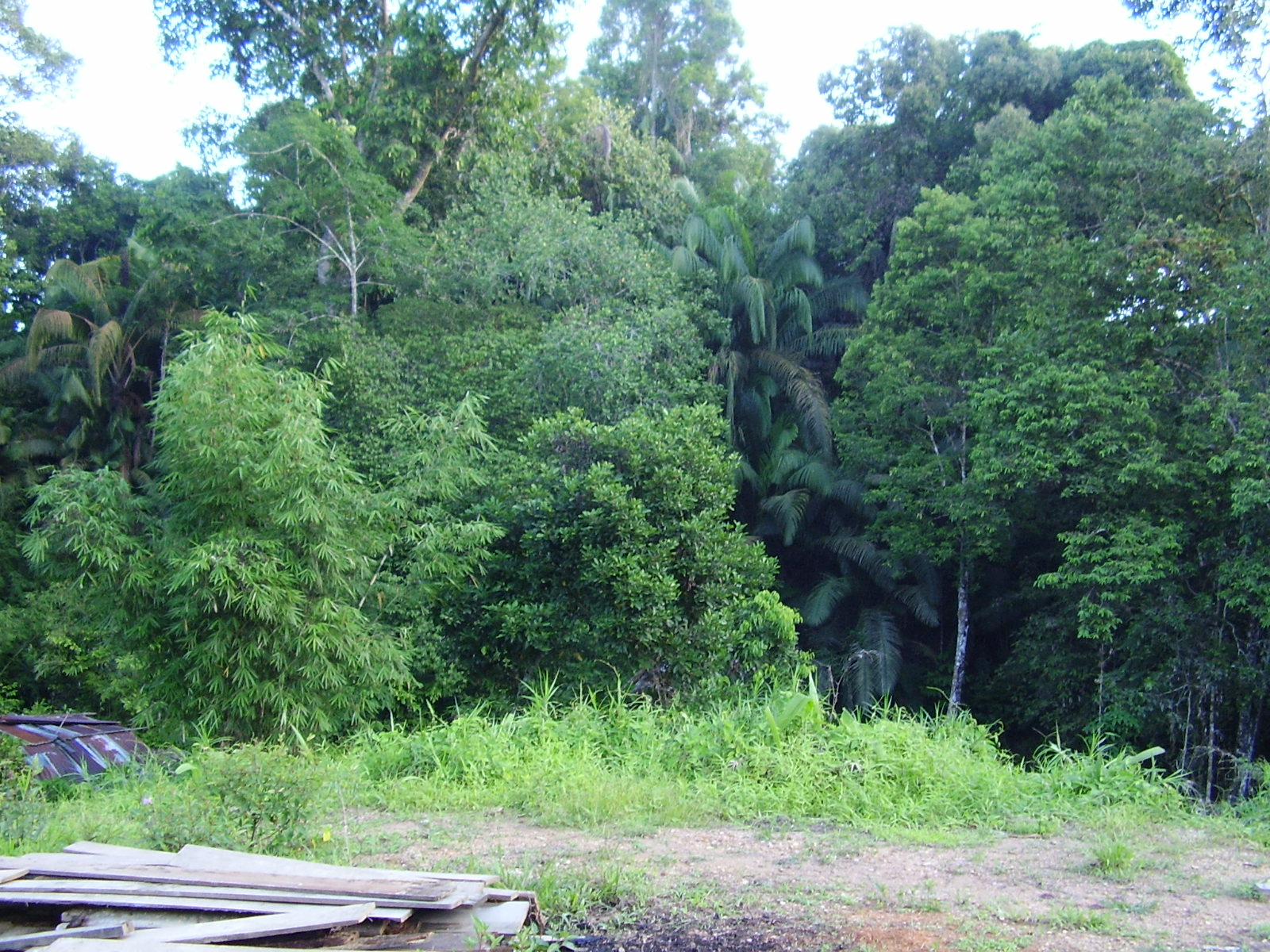
- Rainforest of Ulu Anyut, Betong

- Seal

- Location within Borneo
- Coordinates: 1°24′0″N 111°31′0″E
- Country: Malaysia
- State: Sarawak
- Division: Betong
- District: Betong

Population (2024)
  - Total: 105,157

Betong is a town in Betong Division, Saribas, Sarawak, Malaysia. It was formerly under the Sri Aman District. Betong is located between three main rivers, Batang Lupar, Batang Saribas and Batang Kelaka, and covers an area of 4,180 km^{2}.

In recognition of its rich history, rapid growth and contribution to Sarawak's economy, Betong was accorded Division status in 2002. It was then selected to become the administrative division centre. The areas of administration include the Saratok District and the Betong District. Betong has also been expanded to cover the Small District of Maludam.

== Population ==
According to the Malaysian census, the total population of Betong District declined from 62,131 in 2010 to 46,900 in 2020, representing a decrease of 15,231 over the ten-year period. An estimate from 2015 indicates a population of 101,426 for the entire Betong Division. The majority of residents are Iban (75,923 residents); followed by the next largest ethnic groups are Chinese (20,584 residents), Malay (8,362), Melanau (216), Bidayuh (57), and other ethnics (15).

== Economy and education ==
Betong's main economies are centered on farming, agriculture, and fishing. Most businesses are family-owned.

The Betong Division Development Agency (BDDA) is focusing on income-generating initiatives to boost the region's economy. Under the leadership of Deputy Premier Datuk Amar Douglas Uggah Embas, BDDA has established sub-committees to explore opportunities in tourism, economic activities, and modern agriculture. These efforts align with Sarawak's Post Covid-19 Development Strategy 2030 (PCDS 2030), aiming for the state to achieve developed status by 2030.

Most bus express will pass through Betong junction, but only the Miri-Bintulu-Sibu-Sarikei-Betong-Lubok Antu bus route from Boreneo Bus will enter Betong bus station.

To ensure the development of human capital and to meet the demands of Sarawak Corridor of Renewable Energy, education in Betong has been the subject of significant investment over the years. Betong is acknowledged by many as where early Iban people were educated first.

There are a variety of schools in Betong, including five elementary/national (SK St John, SK Spaoh, SK Nanga Ajau, SK Balingan, SK St Augustine), one middle (SMK Datuk Patinggi Kedit), five secondary (SMK Spaoh, SMK Pusa, SMK Ulu Layar, SMK Beladin, SMK St Augustine), three vocational (Kolej Vokasional, SJK Chung Hua, Pusat GIATMARA), one boarding (Maktab Rendah Sains Mara), and one community (Kolej Komuniti Betong), one polytechnic (Polytechnic Metro).

== Climate ==
Betong has a tropical rainforest climate (Af) with heavy to very heavy rainfall year-round.

Climate data for Betong
Month	Jan	Feb	Mar	Apr	May	Jun	Jul	Aug	Sep	Oct	Nov	Dec	Year
Mean daily maximum °C (°F)	30.2 (86.4)	30.4 (86.7)	31.3 (88.3)	32.0 (89.6)	32.4 (90.3)	32.3 (90.1)	32.1 (89.8)	32.0 (89.6)	31.9 (89.4)	31.7 (89.1)	31.4 (88.5)	30.8 (87.4)	31.5 (88.8)
Daily mean °C (°F)	26.3 (79.3)	26.4 (79.5)	26.9 (80.4)	27.3 (81.1)	27.7 (81.9)	27.5 (81.5)	27.2 (81.0)	27.1 (80.8)	27.2 (81.0)	27.1 (80.8)	26.9 (80.4)	26.6 (79.9)	27.0 (80.6)
Mean daily minimum °C (°F)	22.4 (72.3)	22.4 (72.3)	22.6 (72.7)	22.7 (72.9)	23.1 (73.6)	22.7 (72.9)	22.3 (72.1)	22.3 (72.1)	22.5 (72.5)	22.5 (72.5)	22.5 (72.5)	22.4 (72.3)	22.5 (72.6)
Average rainfall mm (inches)	330 (13.0)	259 (10.2)	286 (11.3)	270 (10.6)	271 (10.7)	192 (7.6)	170 (6.7)	264 (10.4)	270 (10.6)	287 (11.3)	323 (12.7)	402 (15.8)	3,324 (130.9)
Source: Climate-Data.org

== Culture and leisure ==
- Fort Lily

== Notable people ==
=== Arts ===
- Henry Golding, actor

=== Government ===
- Stephen Kalong Ningkan, 1st Chief Minister of Sarawak (1963–1966)
