= Bukit Sadok =

Historic mountain fortress of the Iban leader Rentap in Sarawak, Malaysia

Highest point
- Elevation: 914 m (2,999 ft)
- Coordinates: 1.53333°N 111.75°E

Geography
- Country: Malaysia
- State: Sarawak
- District: Betong Division
- Parent range: Central Sarawak Highlands

Geology
- Mountain type: Hill fortress / historical site

Climbing
- Easiest route: Hike (approx. 3 hours)

Bukit Sadok is a mountain located in the Betong Division of Sarawak, Malaysia. It is historically significant as the stronghold of the Iban warrior Rentap, who led resistance against the White Rajahs of Sarawak during the mid‑19th century. The hill was the site of several major battles between Rentap’s forces and the Brooke administration from 1857 to 1861.

== Location ==
Bukit Sadok rises approximately 3,000 feet above sea level in the interior highlands of Betong. It acts as a natural watershed divider between several major river systems, including the Saribas and Skrang rivers. From the summit, visitors may view the Saribas plains, the surrounding Iban hinterland, and distant coastal areas.

== History ==
During the 19th century, Iban leader Rentap established a fortified stronghold on Bukit Sadok, often referred to as "Rentap's Fort". From this base he organized resistance against the expanding Brooke administration. Between 1857 and 1861, the Brooke government launched several military expeditions against the mountain, led by Charles Brooke. These campaigns targeted Rentap’s fortifications and ultimately resulted in the destruction of his hilltop defenses.

== Cultural significance ==
Bukit Sadok is regarded as a culturally sacred site among the Iban people. Rentap is remembered as a national hero in Sarawak, symbolizing Iban autonomy and resistance to external rule.

== Tourism ==
The hill is accessible to hikers, with the climb typically taking about three hours through dense forest. At the summit, a replica of Rentap's cannon, the Bujang Timpang Berang, is displayed as a symbolic reminder of his fortification. Bukit Sadok is promoted as a major historical attraction in the Betong region, particularly for those interested in Sarawak's anti‑colonial history.

== See also ==
- Rentap
- James Brooke
- Charles Brooke
- History of Sarawak
- Iban people
- Betong Division
