= Rentap =

Rebel and warrior from Sarawak

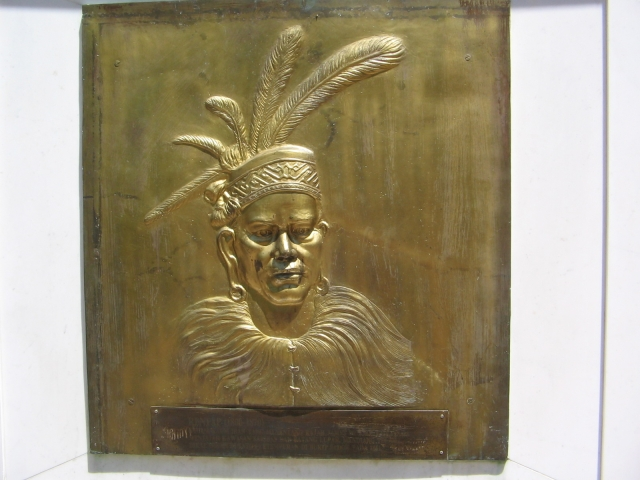
Relief representation of Rentap at Rentap Libau Memorial Monument in Sarawak.

Rentap (born Libau anak Ningkan; c. 1800–1863), also known as Libau Rentap, was a warrior and a recognized Iban hero in Sarawak (now a state of Malaysia) during the reign of the first White Rajah, James Brooke. His praise name, Rentap Tanah, Runtuh Menua translates from the Iban language as 'Earth-tremor, World-shaker'. His famous and frequently quoted slogan was "Agi idup, Agi ngelaban" which translates into "Still alive, still fighting".

== Birth and becoming a warrior ==
Rentap was born in the Skrang area in the Second Division in Sarawak (then part of the Sultanate of Brunei). He was named Libau anak Ningkan by his father and mother, Ningkan and Imbong. They had five children, including Rentap. Not much is known about Rentap until he was appointed as a manok sabong (lead warrior, literally 'fighting rooster' due to roosters being seen as strong and mighty by the Iban) by Chief Orang Kaya Pemancha Dana "Bayang" (commonly known as OKP Dana Bayang or simply Dana Bayang).

Rentap was mentored by Dana Bayang and accompanied him on major ngayau (headhunting) expeditions from south of Sarawak to the Kapuas River in what is now West Kalimantan, Indonesia. When Dana Bayang grew old, Libau Rentap took over as the commanding officer and led several similar sea war expeditions to raid Sambas and Pontianak, Indonesia. During one of these raiding voyages, Rentap attacked and killed a boatful of Sambas people including the nephew of Sultan Sambas. Rentap took the nephew's keris (Malay dagger) which was distinguishable by its golden handle and gained fame from the incident, recognized by the Iban-Dayak Skrangs as their great war chief.

== Rise of the White Rajah ==
James Brooke (1803–1868) was born in India and served as a cavalry lieutenant in the Bengal Army during the First Anglo-Burmese War, before retiring to England to recover from a serious wound. In 1833, he used an inheritance to purchase the schooner Royalist and began trading in the Far East. In August 1839, Brooke arrived in Kuching, Sarawak and assisted the Sultan of Brunei in crushing a Malay rebellion. In 1841, the Sultan gave Brooke the governorship of Sarawak and the following year ceded complete sovereignty of Sarawak to Brooke, the first White Rajah.

Brooke reinstalled the Malay chiefs into their former positions to help him administer their people in the state, and was highly successful in suppressing the widespread piracy of the region. While Brooke was fighting pirates in Sumatra, his enemies were emboldened. Sharif Sahib gathered Arab adventurers along the Batang Lupar river and invited the Skrang Dayaks to meet him at the entrance of the Sadong River, gathering two hundred Dayak bangkongs and Malay war boats. They raided along the coast, though Brooke returned to surprise one expedition and captured several war boats.

Later, the H.M.S. Dido arrived, accompanied by the East Indian Company steamer Phlegethon. It was decided to begin operations by attacking the Arab sharifs in their strongholds on the Batang Lupar river and then the Dayaks on the Skrang River.

Battle of Saribas and Linggi
- Part of Anglo-Bruneian War
Date	1843
Location	Saribas and Linggi
Result	Brooke victory

Commanders and leaders
Nanang; Luyoh; Aji; Linggir Mali Lebu; Rekaya Antau "Linggang Neneri"; Rekaya Gun "Mangku Bumi"	James Brooke; Captain Henry Keppel

=== War between White Rajah and Ibans of Saribas ===
According to the account of Captain Henry Keppel, on 4 June 1843, Brooke and Keppel organised a war expedition to attack the Iban Dayak of Saribas to take the land along the coast.

OKP Dana Bayang's longhouse at Nanga Padeh was the strongest and most important, defended by two forts and a barrier of fallen trees that blocked the Batang Saribas River from being entered easily by their enemies. Brooke's forces took the longhouse and burnt on 11 June 1843. Dana Bayang, who was already old, had delegated the fighting to his three sons: Nanang, Luyoh, and Aji.

Brooke's forces proceeded up the Saribas to Karangan Pinggai and on 14 June attacked the fort of Linggir Mali Lebu, a chief mentored by Dana Bayang. They then attacked the Sungai Rimbas river forts at Sungai Tawai belonging to chiefs Rekaya Antau "Linggang Neneri" and Rekaya Gun "Mangku Bumi".

The defeated chiefs of Saribas and Linggi from Skrang went onboard Brooke's ship to sign the peace treaty of Saribas. The treaty forced them to stop headhunting (ngayau in the Iban language), but they refused to sign it.

On 14 June 1843, Brooke's forces went up to Sungai Paku, the branch of the Saribas River and attacked Linggir Mali Lebu fort at Karangan Pinggai. On 17 June, Brooke's forces went up the Sungai Rimbas which is another branch of the Saribas River. They attacked the fort belonging to the Dayak Iban leader by the name Rekaya Antau "Linggang Neneri" and Rekaya Gun "Mangku Bumi" at Sungai Tawai.

Later, James Brooke summoned the Iban Dayak chiefs Dana Bayang, Linggir Mali Lebu and one Linggi representing Libau Rentap of the Skrang to his ship to sign the peace treaty of Saribas. It would have forced them to stop headhunting. Although, they had surrendered during the fighting, they refused to sign it.

Battle of Batang Lupar and Undop
- Part of Anglo-Bruneian War
Date	1844
Location	Batang Lupar and Undop
Result	Sarawakian victory

Commanders and leaders
Pengiran Indera Mahkota (POW); Sharif Sahib; Sharif Muller; Sharif Jaffar	James Brooke; Captain Henry Keppel; First Lieutenant Charles Wade †

Casualties and losses
Heavy	Heavy

== Battle of Batang Lupar and Undop ==
In August 1844, Brooke and Keppel forced out the Arab sharifs, destroyed Sharif Sahib's stronghold at Patusin, forced out Sharif Muller at Nanga Skrang and Sharif Jaffar and Pengiran Indera Mahkota (deposed governor of Sarawak) at the upper Undop. Sharifs Sahib and Muller fled across the border to the middle Kapuas while Makhota was later captured in a mud at Lingga. The battle at upper Undop deposed Sherif Jaffer of Lingga, bringing relative peace to the coast. First Lieutenant Charles Wade was killed in the action, making Wade the first white man to be slain by the natives of Sarawak. With this settled, Brooke was then determined to squash the Iban Dayaks of Skrang and led a strong troop to attack Rentap.

== Battle of Kerangan Peris ==
Battle of Kerangan Peris
- Part of the Anglo-Bruneian War
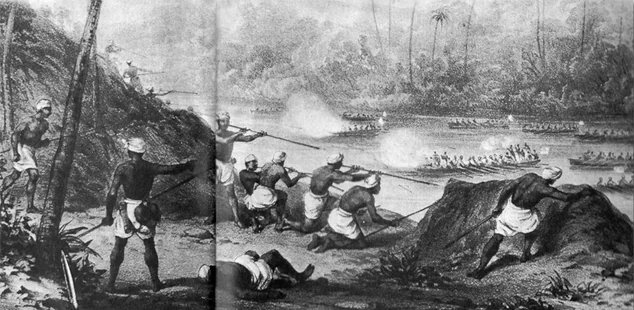
Date	19 August - 26 August 1844 (1 week)
Location	Kerangan Peris
Result	Iban victory

Belligerents
Iban rebels	Raj of Sarawak

Commanders and leaders
Rentap	James Brooke; Datu Patinggi Ali †

Strength
17 or more	thousands (unspecified)

Casualties and losses
1 or more killed	31 killed 56 wounded

On 19 August 1844 at Karangan Peris in the Skrang area was where Rentap first fought against Brooke's forces. He ambushed the advance trackers of Brooke's reconnoitering troop with a formidable array of war boats and thousands of men on either bank of the river, placed to effectively use spears and blowpipes. With boats and bamboo rafts blocking their retreat, the troop's white leader Mr Stewart, a Malay chief Datuk Patinggi Ali and 30 of his men were killed, and 56 others were wounded. This was the first time the Brooke officers saw how devastating the fighting and war with the Iban were.

On 26 August, a Skrang chief arrived, deputed by the other chiefs of Skrang to assure Captain Keppel of their submission and desire for peace.

== Battle of Beting Maru ==
In 1849, the Iban of Saribas and Skrang combined forces to attack those living near the Batang Rajang river mouth. Brooke quickly employed his warship to surprise them upon their return. When the Iban troop reached the Beting Maru sandbar, they were bombarded by cannon fire. Sensing danger, some of the Saribas boats stopped at the sandbar and disembarked to escape overland to Saribas while two main boats made daring attacks on the schooner but were defeated, and tried to escape into the Saribas River. Brooke's force chased after them upriver. At the Battle of Nanga Peka, the Paku Iban and Malay troops enticed Brooke's force into a fight after which Brooke's force suffered casualties including three sons of their Iban chief, Jugah of Lundu. After this defeat, Brooke's force returned to Kuching and sent a captive home to bring Brooke's message requesting the Iban to surrender at Kuching at once to avoid further attack. Meanwhile, the Skrang boats tried to escape by paddling to the Batang Lupar river mouth where they were unsuccessfully ambushed by Brooke's schooner, the Nemesis, which was lying in wait for their return.

== Sarawak expansionism ==
=== Nanga Skrang fort ===
In 1850, after Linggir's defeat at the Battle of Betting Maru, Brooke had a fort built at the junction of the Batang Skrang and the Batang Lupar rivers. The establishment of Fort James at Skrang prevented Rentap's warriors from joining those under Linggir and Aji (Dana Bayang's son) and blocked their passage to the South China Sea where they might raid the people living along the coast. While primarily a defensive measure to keep the peace, this was effectively an embargo against those who had not submitted to Rajah Brooke's rule, preventing them from collecting sea salt and other essentials.

Rentap and his followers responded by moving farther up to the headwaters of the Saribas and Skrang, where they established a stockade on a mountain ridge at the Sungai Lang River.

== Battle of Lintang Batang ==
In 1853, Rentap gathered his men intending to attack the fort at Nanga Skrang and push his way to the South China Sea. In command of the fort, William Brereton learned of Rentap's approach and sent word to Alan Lee, who quickly arrived with a scratch party from a nearby fort. Lee urged Brereton to defend the fort rather than face the Iban-Dayak warriors in the open, but Brereton had built a small stockade a few miles upriver and insisted on defending it.

Brereton was lured out onto the open river, followed by Lee, but their boats were swamped by Rentap's heavy war boats. Brereton's boat capsized and he swam to the riverbank, while Lee fought on and was killed, beheaded by Rentap's son-in-law, Layang. Lee's head was nicknamed Pala Tuan Lee ti mati rugi (Lee's head who died lost). Heavy fire from the stockade then forced Rentap's warriors to retreat upriver, where they came under attack from a rival chief who had sided with the White Rajah. Twenty longhouses belonging to Rentap and his followers were burned.

=== Peace talks ===
Brooke managed to entice Orang Kaya Gasing and the lower Skrang Iban to support him. In December 1853, Rentap and Bulan Apai Jelani agreed to meet with Brooke for a peace talk on the Skrang River. While Rentap was strongly opposed to the presence of white men, Jelani was the figurehead of a party that did not support either side of the conflict but watched to see which side would win. Brooke was accompanied by his nephew, Charles Brooke the Tuan Muda (heir presumptive to the White Rajah, literally 'young lord'), who would become Rentap's opponent in upcoming battles. Despite several meetings to discuss matters between the two parties, they did not reach any satisfactory results, and Rentap, the chief of the upper Skrang Iban swore that he would never again meet the white men to talk about peace or anything else.

== Battle of Sungai Lang ==
Rentap and his followers continued strengthening his fort in Sungai Lang. This fort at the headwaters of the Skrang River, on a hill cleared of jungle, was surrounded by steep slopes with high stakes driven into the earth forming a thick stockade.

In August 1854, Rajah James Brooke proceeded up the Skrang River with a large group of warriors, about 7,000 from the Dayak and the Malay community from Kuching. Due to poor health, Brooke stayed with a strong force to protect their war boats and baggage at Enteban, the navigable extent of the Skrang. Captain John Johnson-Brooke (Rajah James Brooke's eldest nephew), was placed in command of the war expedition, accompanied by his younger brother Charles Brooke, Brereton, and five other English officers.

They marched for four days to reach Rentap's fort and began their attack. A four-pounder gun and rockets were fired at one end of the fort while three-pounder guns were fired at the other. Rentap's forces returned fire with a small cannon and shouted their war-cries: Agi bedarah, agi ngelaban and Agi idup, agi ngelaban ('Still bleeding, still fighting' and 'Still living, still fighting). Early that afternoon, there was a commotion inside the fort and the women and children were seen fleeing from the opposite side.

The Malay Chief Panglima Seman, a Kalaka Malay of the White Rajah's forces, advanced on the fort as the sun set. His warriors opened the stakes with their hands and jumped inside the fort, drawing swords to attack. 50 to 60 of Libau Rentap's warriors were seen racing away over the open ground, covering their bodies with shields as they fled. Rentap was said to have been wounded and carried away by his warriors to a second and much stronger fort located on the summit of Sadok Hill (a.k.a. Bukit Sadok or Mount Sadok).

== Fort at Sadok Hill ==
Rentap's fort at Sadok Hill was regarded by the Iban Dayaks as impregnable. In the Iban-Dayak legends and chants, the Iban-Dayak community describe Sadok Hill (Bukit Sadok) as an inaccessible mountain, protected by the legendary characters of Panggau Libau – namely, Keling Bunga Nuing, Laja Bunga Jawa and many others – and that no enemy would dare to attack it.

Rentap had gathered all the Iban Dayaks from along the Skrang River who were faithful to him, and those in the upper Saribas River who offered him aid so long as he occupied Sadok Hill. Rentap was given the title "Raja Ulu" (King of Upriver), and Sadok Hill became the centre of all opposition to the rule of the White Rajah. The fort stood as an unapproachable centre far removed from danger and a sanctuary to which they could all retire in case of need.

The fort at Sadok Hill was about 2,725 feet above sea level and almost inaccessible on every side because of the cliff. Rentap was satisfied that his fort was very strong and could not be conquered by his enemies. The Iban Dayak thus boasted to themselves that: "The White Man are powerful, having arms and ships at sea but it is only we who are the Iban Dayak, who can walk and fight on land and clamber mountains."

=== Brooke's attack on Rentap's allies ===
In April 1857, Charles Brooke with the Balau Iban from the lower Batang Lupar attacked Aji and OKP Nanang (sons of Dana Bayang) in the Padeh for supporting Rentap and attacking people along the coast who had submitted to the Sarawak government. After a very short fight, Aji and Nanang's longhouses were burnt by the Balau Dayaks.

During this period, Charles Brooke continued the work of persuading chiefs to submit to the White Rajah's rule, rewarding them with open trade and the construction of forts to defend their people while preventing Rentap's followers and allies river access to the South China Sea. Aji was likewise busy visiting warriors and war leaders, inciting them to support a fight against the Sarawak government which continued to extend its power. A sore point was the submission of Linggir, a disciple of Dana Bayang, without consulting his former allies.

== First war expedition to Sadok Hill ==
Charles Brooke organised a war expedition consisting of 3,500 Dayaks and 500 Malays to crush Rentap at his stronghold on Sadok Hill. By 8 June, they were building a stockade at Rapu, located at the end of Sadok Hill facing the position occupied by Rentap.

Rentap's fort was formidable as it was surrounded by a cliff, and the walls were made of vertical ironwood (Tebelian) planks that could not be penetrated by rifle shots. Within the fort, Rentap's warriors had built a platform from which they could shoot at a narrow backbone of rock which was the only approach to the fort. Rentap also had muskets, small cannons and a swivel-gun (captured when Alan Lee was killed at the Battle of Lintang Batang in 1853).

On 9 June, a group of Iban-Dayak warriors came to assist Rentap and attempted to attack Brooke's camp. Brooke sent a division to counter-attack them the following day, driving them back and burning their longhouses. Brooke then tried to get his men to storm the Sadok Hill fort at night but they refused the risk.

At midday on 15 June, Brooke's warriors began to attack the fort under the cover of their pilan screen. At 4:00 p.m., the attacking party reached within a few yards of the fort, whose defenders started throwing spears and stones in addition to using their muskets and small swivel cannons. At 5:30 p.m., the leader of the attacking party, a Malay named Abang Aing, was struck by a musket ball while trying to set fire to the wall. Rentap's warriors beat gongs and cheered in triumph, and the attacking party withdrew with their wounded leader that evening.

First Battle of Bukit Sadok
Date	2 June - 15 June 1857 (1 week and 6 days)
Location	Sadok hill, Sarawak
Result	Ibani victory: Brooke’s forces retreated back to base camp at Sungai Antu.

Belligerents
Iban people	State of Sarawak

Commanders and leaders
Rentap	Charles Brooke; Abang Aing †

Strength
Unknown	4,000

Casualties and losses
Unknown	Unknown

== Broadening conflict ==
=== Death of Ally, Aji ===
Aji, the third son of Dana Bayang, continued to fight those who had submitted to Brooke's rule in the lower Layar river, travelling by land to bypass the fort at Betong. When the fort was completed in 1858, Aji made a show of defiance by having his warriors make a few exchanges of gunfire with the fort's defenders.

In response, Charles Brooke led a force from the Skrang fort to punish Aji and his supporters. When they reached the mouth of the Sungai Langit, Aji suddenly appeared charging across the shallow rapids and was mortally shot. The next day, the force divided into two columns: one sent to the adjacent Julau area to punish Mujah Buah Raya (Rentap's ally); the other, led by Brooke, would attack Sadok Hill.

== Second war expedition to Sadok Hill ==
In 1858, the Second Sadok Expedition, led by Charles Brooke, proceeded from the mouth of the Sungai Langit to the Nanga Tiga (three river mouths) at the Upper Layar River. Brooke's forces erected a stockade to leave their war boats and baggage, and advanced up-country. At Ulu Julau they defeated Mujah Buah Raya, burnt his longhouses and destroyed the surrounding paddy fields.

The expedition reached the summit of Sadok Hill and erected a stockade within firing distance of a small mortar they had brought with them. They fired 50 rounds of shell to little effect. Rentap did not return fire and the place seemed to be deserted. Some of Brooke's men approached the fort and when they were very close, Rentap's warriors opened fire.

Some of Brooke's war chiefs begged him to stop attacking, saying "We cannot pull up the planks with our own hands, we cannot climb over them and our small gun and musket shots make no effect on them." Thus they decided to abandon the attack. The retreat began at once. Rentap mocked them by saying "Bring all your fire guns from England and we are not afraid of you." Some shouted "Agi idup, agi ngelaban!" (Still alive, still fighting!). However, he and his men did not pursue the retreating party down the hill outside their stockade.

=== Alliance with Sharif Masahor ===
Luyoh, in anger over his brother Aji's death, went to Mukah and negotiated with Sharif Masahor. The Sharif was planning to rebel against the White Rajah, and promised to supply gunpowder to other rebels. Luyoh and his brother Nanang attempted to establish a stockade at the mouth of the Spak tributary, but it was attacked and demolished twice in a month by parties from the Betong fort.

Luyoh and Nanang then joined Rentap at Sadok Hill. They brought with them a well-known cannon their father had obtained on a raid, called Bujang Timpang Berang (Angry One-legged Bachelor) as one of its handles had broken. (This gun is on display at Fort Lily, Betong, Saribas. It is marked with the year "1515", and had belonged to the Dutch East India Company in Kalimantan, West Borneo.)

Luyoh and Nanang built a stockade on a ridge below Rentap's fort on Sadok Hill. From there, the brothers and their followers together with Rentap's fighters supported Sharif Masahor's rebellion.

In early February 1860, Masahor mounted an assault on Kuching (then Sarawak), the White Rajah's capital. He planned his approach by the Sarawak River, but Charles Brooke was able to ambush and destroy all of Masahor's ships. Rentap openly joined Masahor in his defence at Mukah and Igan until his defeat and deportation to Singapore in 1861.

== Third war expedition to Sadok Hill ==
It was resolved in September 1861 that Sarawak forces under the command of Charles Brooke should make a third attack on Sadok Hill. On 16 October 1861 the expedition got underway, bringing with them large twelve-pounder brass cannon specially cast for the occasion in Kuching. The cannon was given the name Bujang Sadok (Sadok Bachelor). (It is on display at the Police Museum in Fort Margherita in Kuching.)

On 20 October, Brooke sent two messengers to summon Nanang and Luyoh to a meeting, at which they submitted to the White Rajah, providing 40 valuable ceramic jars named Tajau Rusa to the government of Sarawak to ensure their loyalty. Nanang and Luyoh kept their promises, and the ceramic jars were returned to them after three years. When Rentap learned that the brothers had surrendered without consulting him, he was angered and sent a party to burn their nearby longhouses.

On 28 October, at 4:30 a.m., Brooke's force brought the twelve-pounder Bujang Sadok cannon, ready for action, but could not be used due to dense mist. When the mist cleared at 7:30 a.m., a strong wind likewise prevented the attack. Later, the cannon was put into action but its carriage gave way after firing 17 rounds. However, it had by then torn breaches in the stockade of fortress.

Rentap had briefly returned fire with the Angry One-legged Bachelor. According to the story, Rentap's gunner was killed by a shot from the Sadok Bachelor, and his blood soaked the gunpowder making it useless.

When Rentap realised that he could not continue defending the fortress, he commanded his warriors to leave it from the opposite side of the mountain. The attackers, under cover of the musket fire, rushed over the neck rock and through the breaches made by their cannon. They discovered that Rentap and his warriors had escaped, leaving only the dead and the dying. They found the arms captured by Rentap when he fought against Lee and Brereton at Lintang Batang in 1853, a large quantity of gunpowder, and the Angry One-legged Bachelor.

That afternoon, the attacking party set fire to the fortress. A tongue of flame shot up into the sky with thick black smoke. At dusk, the summit of Sadok Hill could be seen burning from many miles away. It marked the end of Libau Rentap's power over the White Rajah and his long career as an Iban-Dayak war leader.

== End of Rentap's power and death ==
Rentap and his warriors did not surrender, but retreated to Bukit Lanjak Entimau at the headwaters of Batang Skrang, Lemanak and Engkari. He then moved down to the Ulu Entabai, the branch of Kanowit and Julau and built another fortress at Bukit Stulak. When he retired from fighting, he moved to Karangan Panggil in Ulu Wak, Pakan, and died of old age in the year 1863. He was not buried, but his remains were kept according to the symbol of the Iban-Dayak warrior which was honourably laid down to rest in peace in a mortuary known by the Iban Dayak as Lumbong. Later, his remains were installed inside a jar in a traditional ceremony known as Ngerapoh.

His tomb, the Lumbong, is still intact. It is located at the summit of Sibau Hill (Bukit Sibau) at the headwaters of Budu/Kabo River of Saratok and Wak River of Pakan. His remains were placed inside a strong wooden coffin under a shrine after the reburial of his remains in October 1989. This was done by the Sarawak State Government in the Iban-Dayak traditional hero's burial ceremony named Gawai Ngelombong.

Libau Rentap's arch-enemy, Sir James Brooke, the first White Rajah of Sarawak, retired due to ill health in 1863. He died in Burrator, England on 11 June 1868 at the age of 65 and was buried in Sheepstor Churchyard. Sir Charles Brooke was proclaimed Rajah in place of his uncle on 3 August 1868. He died on 17 May 1917 at the age of 88 and was buried beside the tomb of his uncle.

The marriage of Layang to Rentap's daughter Tambong begot a granddaughter, Subang, who was married to Penghulu Dalam Munan Anak Penghulu Minggat of Awik. Munan was a loyal Iban-Dayak chief who led several punitive expeditions on behalf of the Sarawak government. Rentap's principal enemy, the Sarawak government, placed much trust on Penghulu Munan who was married to a granddaughter of the rebel, Rentap. Munan was rewarded by his appointment as the first and only paramount chief with a Penghulu Dalam title, a fixed monthly salary, an office in Sibau (now Sibu) and a member of the Sarawak Supreme Council.

== Legacy ==
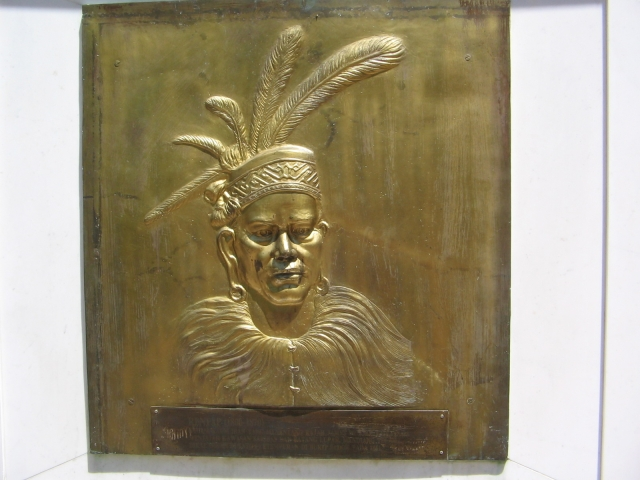
The relief representation of Rentap at Rentap Libau Monument in Sarawak.

Libau Rentap was a man of principle (kih in Iban). He earned several victories and defeats but never once surrendered, even at the expense of losing his homeland in Skrang after being forced to migrate to the farther away northeastern region at Lanjak-Entimau Hill. He had been branded as a great rebellious Iban-Dayak war leader, and survived despite being hunted several times. When he retired from active fighting, he swore that he would never see the face of a white man again in his life, and managed to live until he met his natural death. He fought gallantly, defending his country and his people from several attacks made by intruders until his power was broken on 28 October 1861.

His name is remembered in Sarawak and Malaysia as a great Iban-Dayak chief and war leader, and the hero of Sadok Hill. He continues to inspire some Iban Dayaks, especially those who joined the military initially as trackers like decorated war heroes Kanang anak Langkau and Awang anak Raweng.

The heroes in the Malaysian Armed Forces are 21 holders of Panglima Gagah Berani (PGB) (the bravery medal). Of the total, there are 14 Ibans, one Bidayuh, one Kayan, one Malay and two Chinese army officers. The majority of the Armed Forces are Malays, according to the book Crimson Tide over Borneo.

A book about Rentap entitled Rentap: Warrior, Legend and Enigma was written by James Ritchie and Edmund Langgu Saga.
