= St. Lawrence Anglican Cathedral Ambohimanoro =

St. Lawrence Cathedral
- St. Lawrence Anglican Cathedral Ambohimanoro
- Cathédrale Saint Laurent Ambohimanoro (French); Katedraly Santa Laurent Ambohimanoro (Malagasy)
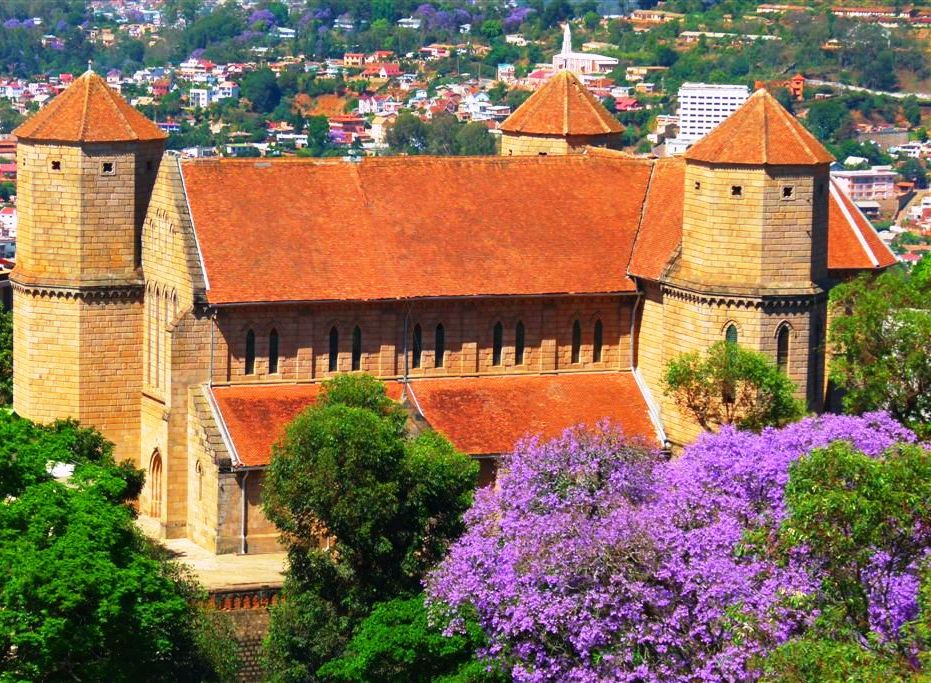

- 18°55′04″S 47°31′57″E
- Location: Antananarivo, Madagascar
- Denomination: Anglican
- Website: cathedrale-anglicane-st-laurent.com

History
- Status: Cathedral
- Founded: 1883
- Dedication: Saint Lawrence

Architecture
- Functional status: Active
- Heritage designation: Historic
- Architect: William White
- Style: Gothic Revival
- Completed: 1889

Administration
- Province: Indian Ocean
- Diocese: Antananarivo

Clergy
- Bishop: Samoela Jaona Ranarivelo

St. Lawrence Anglican Cathedral Ambohimanoro (also known as Saint Laurent in French and Malagasy) is an Anglican cathedral in Madagascar's capital of Antananarivo. Located in the upper part of the city, the cathedral was built on the hill of Ambohimanoro, near the Andohalo square, and has now been designated as a national heritage by the Malagasy government. It is one of the first permanent Anglican churches built on the island.

== History ==
During the reign of Ranavalona I Christians in Madagascar were persecuted and church building suppressed. However, in the succeeding monarchs' reigns, European influence grew and the suppression of Christians was relaxed, with many missionaries, most notably those belonging to the London Missionary Society being invited back in. A turning point in the history of Christianity in Madagascar happened when queen Ranavalona II who had been in part raised by European tutors converted to Christianity.

During this time period Anglican missionaries from the Society for the Propagation of the Gospel were sent to Madagascar. Several years later the first Anglican bishop Kestell Kestell-Cornish was sent to Madagascar. He resided near Ambohimanoro where his congregation met in a small wooden church at Ambatomasina, near the cathedral's current location. Eventually he was given permission to build a permanent building. Assisted by the bishop, the first stone was laid in 1883 by then prime minister Rainilaiarivony. The church was designed by English architect William White and built by Norwegian Alfred Anker in the neo-Gothic style. Since its completion in 1889, several renovations have taken place, most notably the replacement of the stained glass windows that have been imported from England as well as the replacement of the roof tiles.

In October 2017 Princess Anne attended a Service of Thanksgiving to commemorate the 200th anniversary of the Diplomatic relationship between Madagascar and the United Kingdom at the cathedral, alongside Madagascar president Hery Rajaonarimampianina during her visit to the country, making it the highest-ranked member of the British royal family to officially visit the location.

== Bishops ==
The following bishops have been seated at St. Lawrence Cathedral, as bishops of Madagascar until 1969 when the diocese was divided and the Cathedral became the seat of the bishop for the diocese of Antananarivo.

- 1874–1896 : Kestell Kestell-Cornish
- 1899–1919 : George Lanchester King
- 1919–1925 : George Kestell-Cornish
- 1926–1940 : Ronald O'Ferrall
- 1940–1950 : Gerald Richard Vernon
- 1952–1961 : Thomas Richards Parfitt
- 1961–1975 : Jean Marcel
- 1976–1984 : Ephraim Randrianovona
- 1984–2005 : Remi Joseph Rabenirina
- 2008–present : Samoela Jaona Ranarivelo

== See also ==
- List of cathedrals in Madagascar
