= French Chang-Him =

Seychellois archbishop (1938–2023)

The Most Reverend French Chang-Him OBE
- Archbishop and Primate of the Province of the Indian Ocean
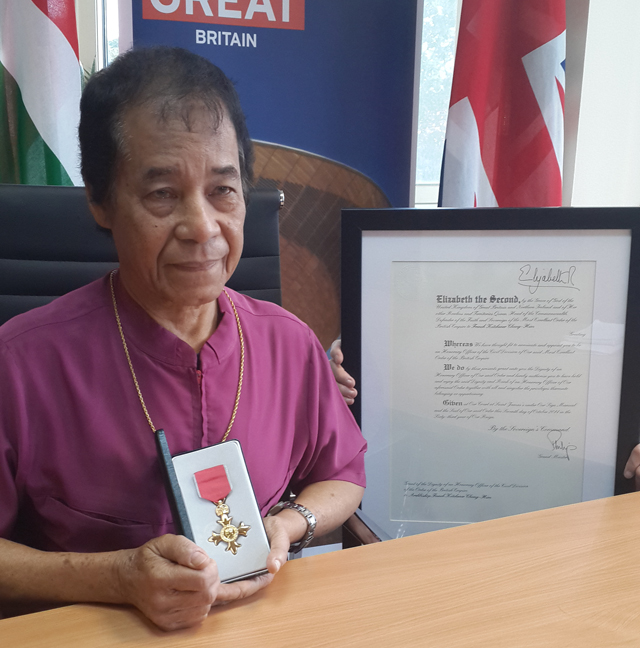
- Chang-Him in 2014
- Church: Church of the Province of the Indian Ocean
- Diocese: The Seychelles
- In office: 1984–1995
- Predecessor: Trevor Huddleston
- Successor: Remi Joseph Rabenirina
- Previous posts: Bishop of the Seychelles, 1979–2004

Orders
- Ordination: 1962
- Consecration: 1979

Personal details
- Born: French Kitchener Chang-Him; May 10, 1938 Seychelles
- Died: May 26, 2023 (aged 85)
- Education: Lichfield Theological College; Trinity College, Toronto

French Kitchener Chang-Him OBE (10 May 1938 – 26 May 2023) was a Seychellois Anglican bishop who was active in the second half of the 20th century.

== Early life and education ==
Born in Seychelles and son of Francis Chang King-Hime and Amelia Zoé, Chang-Him was educated at Lichfield Theological College and Trinity College, Toronto.

== Career ==
He became a primary school teacher in 1958 and was ordained in 1962. After a curacy in Goole he was the rector of Praslin, then Archdeacon of the Seychelles and finally its Vicar general. In 1979 he was appointed the Bishop of The Seychelles, resigning in 2004; and in 1984 the Archbishop of the Indian Ocean, resigning in 1995.

In 1975, Chang-Him married Susan Talma (died 1996). The couple had twin daughters. He was appointed an Honorary Officer of the Order of the British Empire (OBE) in the 2014 Special Honours "for services to human rights, reconciliation and democratic values and to British nationals in Seychelles."

== Death ==
Chang-Him died on 26 May 2023, at the age of 85.

Church of England titles
Preceded by George Cardell Briggs	Bishop of The Seychelles; 1979–2004	Succeeded by Santosh Marray
Preceded by Ernest Urban Trevor Huddleston	Archbishop of the Indian Ocean; 1984–1995	Succeeded by Remi Joseph Rabenirina
