= Marc Ravelonantoandro =

Malagasy Roman Catholic priest and academic

The Reverend Marc Ravelonantoandro

Rector of the Catholic University of Madagascar
- Incumbent
- Assumed office 2013
- Preceded by: Charles Raymond Ratongavao

Personal details
- Education: University of Toamasina (HDR)
- Occupation: Priest, academic

Marc Ravelonantoandro is a Malagasy Roman Catholic priest and academic. He has been Rector of the Catholic University of Madagascar since 2013.

== Biography ==
Ravelonantoandro was ordained to the priesthood in 1992.

Since 2013, he has been Rector at the Catholic University of Madagascar. Under his tenure, the university established a doctoral school and a psychology department. In 2017, he earned a doctorate from the University of Toamasina. He completed his studies for a diplôme d'habilitation à diriger des recherches (HDR) (Diploma of Authorization to Direct Research), and his thesis was entitled "Anthropological and Theological Insights of the Human of Fihavanana in the Image of God".

== Bibliography ==
- Comprendre pour croire: Être malgache chrétien, connaitre les croyances ancestrales pour s'ouvrir à l'Évangile [Understand to Believe: Being a Christian Malagasy, knowing ancestral beliefs to open up to the Gospel]. Presses Académiques Francophones. 2016. ISBN 978-3-8416-3619-5.

== See also ==
- List of Catholic priests
