= Catholic University of Madagascar =

- Former names: Higher Institute of Theology and Philosophy of Madagascar (1960–1973); Higher Institute of Theology (1973–1997); Catholic Institute of Madagascar (1997–2011)
- Motto: Fides et Lux (Latin)
- Motto in English: Faith and Light
- Type: Private, coeducational
- Established: 1960; 66 years ago
- Affiliations: Roman Catholic Church
- Chancellor: Most Rev. Odon Razanakolona
- Rector: Rev. Marc Ravelonantoandro
- Location: Antananarivo, Analamanga Region, Madagascar
- Language: French
- Colours: Red & white
- Website: www.ucm.mg

The Catholic University of Madagascar (UCM; French: Université Catholique de Madagascar; Malagasy: Oniversite Katolika eto Madagasikara) is a private university located in Antananarivo, Madagascar. Founded in 1960 as an institute within the Major Seminary of Antananarivo, it later became an independent institute. It gained accreditation from the Malagasy government in 2000, and in 2011 took its present name.

The university is located in the heart of Antananarivo, Madagascar's capital city. The campus includes a large historic building and a sizable amphitheatre. Academics are split between four departments: the Social Sciences, Theology, Philosophy, and Psychology. The university contains a research center, publishes two scientific journals, and has partnerships with multiple international universities. The university is under the supervision of the Episcopal Conference of Madagascar, and is the only university affiliated with the Catholic Church in Madagascar.

== History ==
The Catholic University of Madagascar's roots date back to 1916, with the establishment of the Major Seminary of Antananarivo by French missionary priests. On 25 February 1960, the High Institute of Theology and Philosophy of Madagascar (ISTPM) was created as an institute within the seminary, becoming an associate institution of the Theological Faculty of the University of Naples. In 1961, the ISTPM awarded the first bachelor's degree in Theology in Madagascar's history. In 1973, the ISTPM changed its name to the Higher Institute of Theology (ISTA). Still associated with the Major Seminary of Antananarivo, the "A" in its acronym stood for Ambatoroka, the neighborhood of Antananarivo to which the seminary and the ISTA had relocated to in 1930. It was also in 1973 that the ISTA ended its partnership with the Theological Faculty of Naples.

During the political and economic crisis of 1991, the Episcopal Conference of Madagascar called for the ISTA to reorganize and incorporate courses in economics, social science, and political science in addition to theology and philosophy. These changes were fully incorporated in 1994, through cooperation with consultants, business executives, economists, and political figures. In 1997, the ISTA changed its name to the Catholic Institute of Madagascar (ICM). In October 1998, a Faculty of Social Sciences was established alongside the philosophy and theology departments. That same year, the Malagasy government accredited the undergraduate education of the Department of Philosophy. In 1999, the Catholic Institute of Madagascar signed an agreement of cooperation with the Catholic University of Lyon in Lyon, France, affiliating the ICM's Department of Philosophy with its equivalent at Lyon, and created a master's degree program.

On 2 August 2000, the Catholic Institute of Madagascar as a whole, including all its faculties and departments, received accreditation by the Government of Madagascar. In 2004, the Faculty of Social Sciences created a master's degree program in research, and in 2005, a master's in law and political science was inaugurated. In 2011, the ICM was renamed the Catholic University of Madagascar. In 2015, the university opened its first doctoral school, entitled the School of Ethics for Political, Legal, Social, and Human Development (EDHIS-JP). The next year, the Department of Psychology was established, and partnered with the Catholic University of Toulouse.

== Campus ==
The campus of the Catholic University of Madagascar is located in the Ambatoroka neighborhood, in the heart of Antananarivo, the capital of Madagascar. The main building on campus is a historic, European-style edifice, which was built in the 1920s. There is also an amphitheatre seating 300 people, a large library, and a chapel.

== Administration and organization ==
The Catholic University of Madagascar is located within the Roman Catholic Archdiocese of Antananarivo and is administered by the Episcopal Conference of Madagascar. The university is led by a rector, accompanied by a Board of Managers and an Academic Board. Below the rector are a vice rector, an assistant rector, and a secretary-general. The current rector is the Rev. Marc Ravelonantoandro. The Archbishop of Antananarivo, Odon Razanakolona, holds the title of Grand Chancellor.

The university is a member of the Francophone University Association, the Forum of Catholic Education in the Indian Ocean, and the International Federation of Catholic Universities.

Academic departments
School	Year founded
Department of Philosophy	1960
Department of Theology	1960
Faculty of Social Sciences	1998
Doctoral School	2015
Department of Psychology	2016

== Academics ==
=== Curriculum ===
The Catholic University of Madagascar is divided into four departments: the Faculty of Social Sciences, and the departments of Philosophy, Theology, and Psychology.

The Faculty of Social Sciences is itself divided into three departments: Business and Economics, Law and Political Science, and Applied Social Sciences. The Applied Social Sciences curriculum is the core curriculum for undergraduates' first two semesters. It offers a Bachelor of Social Sciences Applied to Development, and master's degrees in Society and Development and Population and Development. The Department of Law and Political Science offers a Bachelor of Law and master's degrees in public law, private law, business law, political science, international relations.

The Faculty of Social Sciences' Department of Business and Economics offers bachelor's and master's degrees in economics, public economics, management, and business administration. The Business section of the department is partnered with its equivalent department at the Catholic University of Lyon, and offers bachelor's and master's degrees in management and business administration. The Economics section is partnered with the Research Institute for Development, the Popinter Laboratory of Paris-Sorbonne University, and the University of Rennes 1. It offers bachelor's degrees in economics, and master's degrees in macroeconomics, and public economics.

The Department of Philosophy uses the canonical degree system, awarding the Bachelor of Philosophy and the Licentiate of Philosophy. It is affiliated with the Faculty of Philosophy at the Catholic University of Lyon, and participates in teacher exchanges with the University of Milan, the University of Toliara, and the Higher Institute of Theology and Philosophy of Madagascar. In addition, the department maintains research ties with the departments of philosophy at the University of Antananarivo and the University of Toliara. The Department of Theology at UCM educates priests, seminarians, and laypeople. The curriculum is spread over five years, and includes the Bachelor of Sacred Theology and the Licentiate of Sacred Theology. In addition, it provides training for those working in ecclesiastical capacities and also has courses available for those not seeking a degree.

The Department of Psychology offers bachelor's master's degrees in psychology. Its motto is: "Respect, Autonomy, Integrity." The Doctoral School, entitled the School of Ethics for Political, Legal, Social, and Human Development, offers a Doctor of Philosophy (PhD) program that abides by international standards. The program lasts three years, and each student is guided by a professor chosen from any of the six academic departments.

=== Library ===
The Catholic University of Madagascar contains a library of more than 100,000 books and subscriptions to 23 newspapers and journals.

=== Research ===
The Catholic University of Madagascar contained a dedicated research center, and publishes two academic journals, the quarterly Aspects du Christianisme à Madagascar (ACM) and the annual Collection ISTA. Regular conferences are hosted on a variety of topics, and an interdisciplinary symposium is held every two years. The university maintains a scientific partnership with the Research Institute for Development in Marseille, France. Other international partner institutions include: the University of Fribourg in Switzerland, the University of Milan in Italy, the University of La Réunion in Réunion, the Université de Sherbrooke in Quebec, Canada, and the universities of Auvergne, Burgundy, Paris Descartes, Toulouse, Lyon, Rennes 1, and Angers, all in France. Domestic collaborative institutions include the University of Antananarivo, the University of Toliara, and the Higher Institute of Theology and Philosophy of Madagascar.

== Student life ==
The Catholic University of Madagascar hosts a variety of student activities, including an art club, a debate club, a theatre group, a martial arts club, a music club, a student choir, and groups for ballroom and street dance. A student newspaper is also published. In addition, there is a campus ministry program and a charity association, UCMCharité.

== Athletics ==
The Catholic University of Madagascar supports football (soccer), volleyball, and basketball clubs.

== People ==
=== List of rectors ===
- Rev. Germain Rajoelison (ca. 2007)
- Rev. Odilon Tiankavana (ca. 2007 – 2013)
- Rev. Marc Ravelonantoandro (2013–2022)
- Rev. Lambert Rakotoarisoa (2022–)

=== Notable alumni ===
- Samoela Jaona Ranarivelo, Anglican Bishop of Antananarivo

=== Notable faculty ===
- Abdon Rafidison, rector of the Major Seminary of Antananarivo

== See also ==
- List of universities in Madagascar
- Education in Madagascar
