= Danny Elizabeth =

Seychellois Anglican bishop

The Right Reverend Danny Elizabeth
- Bishop of the Seychelles
- Church: Church of the Province of the Indian Ocean
- Diocese: Seychelles
- In office: 2025–present
- Predecessor: James Wong

Orders
- Consecration: 3 August 2025 by Gilbert Rateloson Rakotondravelo

Personal details
- Born: 1966 or 1967 (age 58–59)

Danny Rolland Henry Elizabeth is a Seychellois Anglican bishop. He has been the fifth bishop of the Seychelles since 2025.

== Biography ==
Prior to his election as bishop, he was archdeacon of the Seychelles. He chaired the board of the Night Pastors, a group of ministers who work with alcoholics, drug addicts and sex workers on the streets of Victoria in the night hours. He was elected bishop in June 2025 following the retirement of James Wong and consecrated and installed at St. Paul's Cathedral in Victoria in August 2025. Elizabeth was received by President Wavel Ramkalawan for a courtesy visit shortly after his consecration.

Anglican Communion titles
Preceded by James Wong	Bishop of Seychelles; Since 2025	Incumbent
