= List of cathedrals in Madagascar =

This is the list of cathedrals in Madagascar.

== Roman Catholic ==
Cathedrals of the Catholic Church in Madagascar:

- Cathedral of St. Joseph in Ambanja
- Cathedral of the Holy Trinity in Ambatondrazaka
- Cathedral of the Immaculate Heart of Mary in Ambositra
- Cathedral of the Immaculate Conception in Andohalo, Antananarivo
- Cathedral of Our Lady of La Salette in Antsirabe
- Cathedral of St. Matthew in Antsiranana
- Cathedral of Our Lady of the Assumption in Boriziny
- Cathedral of the Sacred Heart of Jesus in Farafangana
- Cathedral of St. Maurice in Fenoarivo Atsinanana
- Cathedral of the Holy Name of Jesus in Fianarantsoa
- Cathedral of St. Vincent de Paul in Ihosy
- Cathedral of St. Augustine in Mananjary
- Cathedral of the Holy Heart of Mary in Mahajanga
- Cathedral of Christ the King in Miarinarivo
- Cathedral of the Sacred Heart of Jesus in Moramanga
- Cathedral of the Sacred Heart of Jesus in Morombe
- Cathedral of Mary Queen of the World in Morondava
- Cathedral of St. Joseph in Toamasina
- Cathedral of St. Vincent de Paul in Taolanaro
- Cathedral of St. Vincent de Paul in Toliara
- Cathedral of Our Lady of Good Remedy in Tsiroanomandidy

== Anglican ==
Cathedrals of the Anglican Church in Madagascar, also known as the Eklesia Episkopaly Malagasy (Episcopal Church of Madagascar in English):

- Cathedral of Saint Lawrence (Santa Laurent) in Ambohimanoro, Antananarivo
- Cathedral of Saint James (Santa Jakoba) in Toamasina
- Cathedral of Saint Matthew (Santa Matio) in Antsiranana
- Cathedral of Saint Luke (Santa Lioka) in Mahajanga
- Cathedral of Saint Patrick (Santa Patrika) in Andranomena, Toliara
- Cathedral of Saint Mark (Santa Marka) in Fianarantsoa

== See also ==
- List of cathedrals
- Eastern Orthodoxy in Madagascar
