= Bishop of Seychelles =

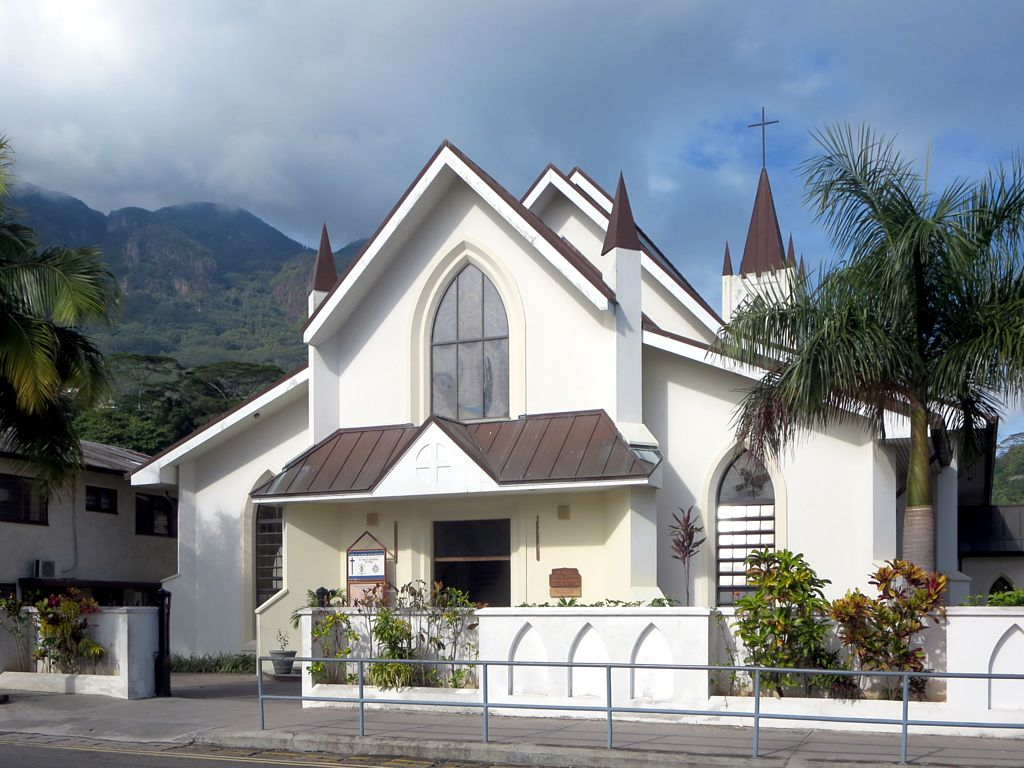
St. Paul's Anglican Cathedral in Victoria, Seychelles.

The Bishop of Seychelles has been the Ordinary of the Anglican Church in the Seychelles in the Indian Ocean since its inception in 1973. The most recent bishop is Danny Elizabeth.

== Bishops ==
- George Briggs (1973–1979)
- French Chang-Him (1979–2004)
- Santosh Marray (2004–2009)
- James Wong (2009–2025)
- Danny Elizabeth (Since 2025)
