= Benzies =

Benzies is a surname. Notable people with the surname include:

- Keith Benzies (1938–2002), Anglican bishop in Madagascar
- Leslie Benzies (born 1971), Scottish video game producer
