= St Patrick's Cathedral, Andranomena, Toliara =

Church in Toliara, Madagascar

The Cathedral of Saint Patrick is the Cathedral of the Anglican Diocese of Toliara, in the south of Madagascar. The Diocese of Toliara is within the Eklesia Episkopaly Malagasy, and is part of the Indian Ocean Province

Following the split from the Diocese of Antananarivo in 2013, a cathedral was needed for the new diocese. The church was dedicated on 13 March 2016. The Rt. Rev. Dr. Todd A. McGregor was elected in 2013 as the first Diocesan Bishop of Toliara.

== See also ==
- List of cathedrals in Madagascar
