= St. James' Cathedral, Toamasina =

Church in Toamasina, Madagascar

The Cathedral of Saint James in Toamasina is the Cathedral of the Anglican Diocese of Toamasina, Madagascar.

The Diocese of Toamasina was created in 1969 (originally as the Diocese of Tamatave) following the split of the Diocese of Madagascar into three, and is part of the Eklesia Episkopaly Malagasy (in English the Malagasy Episcopal Church) or the Anglican Church in Madagascar, and is part of the Church of the Province of the Indian Ocean.

Former archbishop Remi Rabenirina was a parish priest at the cathedral in the 1970s.
