= Robert Cornish =

Robert Cornish may refer to:

- Robert E. Cornish (1903–1963), child prodigy, who gained fame for his work attempting to resuscitate the dead
- Robert Kestell Kestell-Cornish (1824–1909), first Bishop of Madagascar, 1874–1896
- William Robert Cornish (also W. R. Cornish, 1828–1896), British physician who served in India
