= Oliver Simon =

English Anglican bishop (born 1945)

- Bishop of Antsiranana
- Church: Church of the Province of the Indian Ocean
- Diocese: Diocese of Antsiranana
- In office: 2012–2015
- Predecessor: Roger Chung Po Chuen
- Successor: Théophile Botomazava
- Other posts: Team Vicar, Rugby (2005–2010); Director of Studies, Diocese of Mauritius (2010–2012)

Orders
- Ordination: 1971 (deacon); 1972 (priest) by Eric Knell (deacon); Kenneth Woollcombe (priest)
- Consecration: 19 February 2012 by Ian Ernest

Personal details
- Born: 1945 (age 80–81)
- Denomination: Anglican
- Education: Durham University

Oliver Simon (born 1945) is a retired Anglican bishop and Church of England priest. After a 40-year ministry as a priest, he served as Bishop of Antsiranana in Madagascar from 2012 until 2015.

== Education ==
Simon was educated at Durham University, gaining his Bachelor of Arts (BA) degree in Geography 1967. He then attended the University of Sussex, where he gained his Master of Arts (MA) in 1968, before going on to train for the ministry at Cuddesdon College from 1969. He was ordained a deacon on 26 September 1971 (by Eric Knell, Bishop of Reading, at St John's Reading) and a priest around Michaelmas 1972 (by Kenneth Woollcombe, Bishop of Oxford, at the University Church of St Mary the Virgin, Oxford).

== Priest ==
His title post (first curacy) was at Kidlington until 1974, when he moved to a second curacy at Bracknell. In 1978, he took his first incumbency, becoming Vicar of Frodsham until 1988, when he moved to Easthampstead, where he served as Rector for twelve years — during which time he also studied with the University of Sheffield, being awarded his Master in Ministry and Theology (MMinTheol) in 1994. He became Chaplain at Ripon College Cuddesdon, Chaplain to the Community of St Mary the Virgin (both 2000–2005) and also Chaplain at Pembroke College, Oxford (2003–2004). His last incumbency was as Team Vicar in the Rugby Team Ministry from 2005 until 2010: during this period he also served as Ordained Local Ministry (OLM) Officer and Director of Studies for the Diocese of Coventry (from 2006) and OLM Tutor at The Queen's Foundation (from 2007), and wrote a Doctor of Ministry (DMin) thesis for the University of London (awarded 2009).

== Bishop ==
Simon retired from all his posts effective 1 September 2010 and moved abroad to become Director of Studies for the Diocese of Mauritius. On 19 February 2012, he was consecrated (by Ian Ernest, Archbishop of the Indian Ocean) to become Bishop of Antsiranana (diocesan bishop of the Antsiranana diocese), where he served until 2015. In 2014, he announced his intention to resign the next year and arranged for the election of a coadjutor bishop to succeed him. Simon then returned to live in Colyton, Devon.

On 11 February 2017, fourteen retired bishops signed an open letter to the then-serving bishops of the Church of England. In an unprecedented move, they expressed their opposition to the House of Bishops' report to General Synod on sexuality, which recommended no change to the Church's canons or practises around sexuality. By 13 February, a serving bishop (Alan Wilson, Bishop of Buckingham) and nine further retired bishops — including Simon — had added their signatures; on 15 February, the report was rejected by synod.

== Styles and titles ==
- The Reverend Oliver Simon (1971–2009)
- The Reverend Doctor Oliver Simon (2009–2012)
- The Right Reverend Doctor Oliver Simon (2012–present)

Anglican Communion titles
Preceded by Roger Chung Po Chuen	Bishop of Antsiranana; 2012–2015	Succeeded by Théophile Botomazava
