= Bahia Massoundi =

Comorian politician (born 1976)

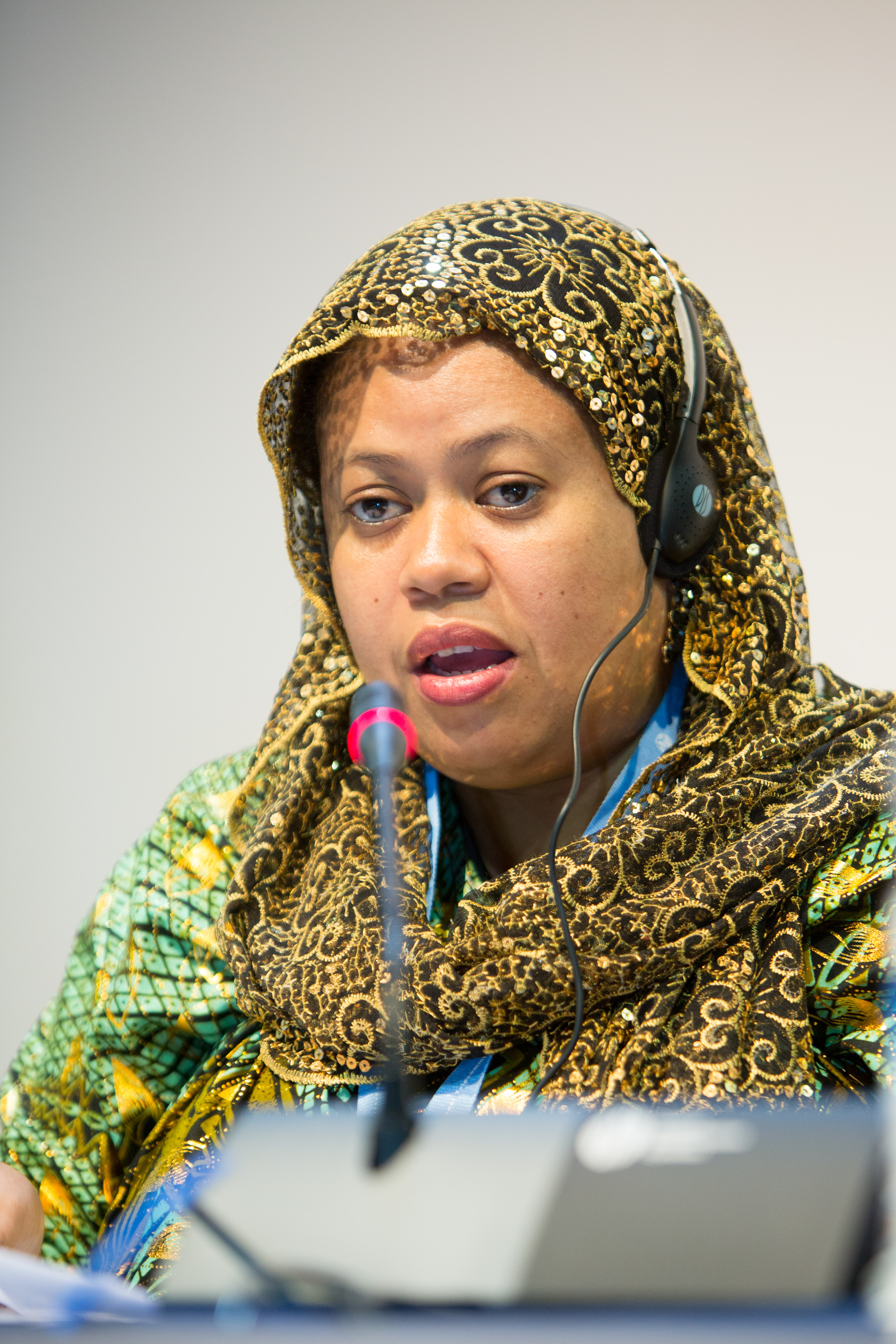
Massoundi speaking at a conference, 2014

Bahia Massoundi (born 28 February 1976) is a Comorian politician and government minister.

== Early life and education ==
Massoundi was born on 28 February 1976 in Mutsamudu. She studied at the University of Toliara in Madagascar.

== Career ==
Massoundi worked as a teacher at the Mursamudu High School from 2001 until 2010. She was a delegate for human rights between 2011 and 2013.

On 13 July 2013, Massoundi was appointed Minister of Posts and Telecommunications, Transport and Tourism by President Ikililou Dhoinine. She was criticised in April 2015 for withdrawing authorisation for Int'Air Îles to fly after they did not wait for her to board a flight. Dhoinine then summoned her to lift the ban.

== Personal life ==
Massoundi is married to Mohamed Bacar, the National Director of the Comoros Examination Board. In June 2015, he was arrested for selling tests.
