= Gerald Vernon =

Gerald Richard Vernon (13 February 1899 – 12 May 1963) was an Anglican bishop in the mid 20th century.

He was educated at Twyford School, Winchester College and Magdalen College, Oxford and ordained in 1924.

Vernon was made a deacon on Trinity Sunday 1923 (27 May) and ordained a priest the following Trinity Sunday (15 June 1924) — both times by Winfrid Burrows, Bishop of Chichester, at Chichester Cathedral; and began his ordained ministry with a nine-year curacy at Christ Church, St Leonards-on-Sea after which he was its vicar for a further eight years. In 1940 he became the fifth Bishop of Madagascar, a position he held for a decade. He was consecrated a bishop by Cosmo Lang, Archbishop of Canterbury, on St James's Day 1940 (25 July) at St Paul's Cathedral. Returning to England he was the vicar of Finedon and an Assistant Bishop of Peterborough. In 1957 he became Dean of St John's Cathedral, Belize, a position he held until his death.

Church of England titles
Preceded by Ronald O'Ferrall	Anglican Bishop of Madagascar; 1940–1950	Succeeded by Thomas Parfitt
