= Darrell Critch =

Canadian-born Madagascan Anglican bishop

The Right Reverend Darrell Critch
- Bishop of Mahajanga
- Church: Anglican Church in North America; Church of the Province of the Indian Ocean
- Diocese: Mahajanga
- In office: 2024–present
- Predecessor: Hall Speers

Orders
- Consecration: 15 December 2024 by James Wong

Personal details
- Born: 1970 or 1971 (age 54–55) Newfoundland and Labrador

Darrell Critch (born 1972) is a Canadian-born Anglican bishop. Since December 2024, he has been the third diocesan bishop of Mahajanga, Madagascar, in the Church of the Province of the Indian Ocean. Prior to his election as bishop, he was the founding rector of the Anglican Church of the Good Samaritan in St. John's, Newfoundland and Labrador.

== Early life, education and ordained ministry ==
Critch is a native of Newfoundland. After receiving music degrees from Memorial University of Newfoundland and an M.Div. at Nashotah House, he was ordained in the Anglican Church of Canada's Diocese of Eastern Newfoundland and Labrador. He later received a D.Min. from Nashotah House.

During the Anglican realignment in 2008, while serving as rector of St. Mary the Virgin in St. John's, Critch was removed from his office by then-Bishop Cyrus Pitman. Critch then joined the Anglican Network in Canada and planted Good Samaritan. Good Samaritan worshiped at 27 different locations during its first 12 years, but in 2020, the church received an anonymous CAD2.5 million gift that allowed it to purchase the former Anglican Church of St. Michael and All Angels on 10 St. Clare Road in St. John's. The church, built in 1959, had been deconsecrated and used as a fitness center. The church is also the home of Packer College, ANiC's diocesan seminary, where Critch was founding chaplain. Critch was also a regional archdeacon for ANiC.

== Episcopacy ==
In August 2024, Critch was elected as the third missionary bishop of Mahajanga by the bishops of the Province of the Indian Ocean. He was encouraged to discern a call to Mahajanga by Bill Atwood, the ACNA's dean of international affairs, during the Global South Fellowship of Anglican Churches' Cairo assembly in June 2024. Critch will continue to live part-time in St. John's, serving at Good Samaritan and fundraising in North America for the Diocese of Mahajanga. According to ANiC Bishop Dan Gifford, part of Critch's role will be to prepare the diocese―which has just 12 priests―to elect indigenous leadership in the future.

Archbishop James Wong consecrated Critch as bishop at the cathedral in Mahajanga on 15 December 2024. Critch was the first priest from the Anglican Church in North America, a GAFCON and Global South province not recognized by the Archbishop of Canterbury, to be made a diocesan bishop in an Anglican Communion province. After becoming bishop of Mahajanga, Critch revoked the permission his predecessor had granted for women to be ordained and pursued the restoration of the non-ordained office of deaconess in the diocese.

== Personal life ==
Critch is married to Sarah; they have one son and are foster parents.

Anglican Communion titles
Preceded by Hall Speers	Bishop of Mahajanga; Since 2024	Incumbent
