= Hall Speers =

Irish-born Madagascan Anglican bishop

The Right Reverend S. Hall Speers
- Bishop of Mahajanga
- Church: Church of England; Church of the Province of the Indian Ocean
- Diocese: Mahajanga
- In office: 2019–2024
- Predecessor: Jean-Claude Andrianjafimanana
- Successor: Darrell Critch

Orders
- Consecration: 2019 by James Wong

Personal details
- Born: October 1946 (age 79) Northern Ireland

Samuel Hall Speers (born October 1946) is an Irish-born Anglican bishop. He served from 2019 to 2024 as the second diocesan bishop of Mahajanga, Madagascar, in the Church of the Province of the Indian Ocean.

== Biography ==
Speers is a native of Urney, Northern Ireland. He attended Selwyn College, Cambridge and is married with three children. Speers became a priest in the Church of England; from 1996 to 2002, he was rural dean of Lafford.

Following his retirement from parish ministry, Speers was elected the second bishop of Mahajanga, a missionary diocese in Madagascar with at the time just 12 non-stipendiary priests serving 30 congregations. He was consecrated by Archbishop James Wong in April 2019 at the cathedral in Mahajanga. Senate President Rivo Rakotovao was in attendance representing the Madagascar government.

During his episcopacy, Speers built partnerships with congregations in the Church of Ireland Diocese of Derry and Raphoe to raise funds for the missionary work in Mahajanga. He retired in March of 2024 after five years as bishop.

Anglican Communion titles
| Preceded by Jean-Claude Andrianjafimanana | Bishop of Mahajanga; 2019–2024 | Succeeded by Darrell Critch |
