= Jean Marcel =

Jean Marcel (1903–December 1980) was the seventh Anglican Bishop of Madagascar from 1961 to 1969 when the diocese split into three. Marcel then became Bishop of Antananarivo until 1975.

Marcel trained for the priesthood at Dorchester Missionary College and was ordained in 1931. He was a tutor at St Paul's College, Ambatoharanana then priest in charge of Marovoay and then Ankadinondry. From 1952 to 1961 he was chaplain to the Bishop of Madagascar; and from 1956 an assistant bishop of the diocese. In 1961 he was appointed successor to Bishop Parfitt.

He died in 1980.

Religious titles
Preceded by Thomas Richards Parfitt	Anglican Bishop of Madagascar; 1961 – 1969	Succeeded by Diocese split
Preceded by Inaugural appointment	Bishop of Antananarivo; 1969 – 1975	Succeeded by Ephraim Randrianovana
