= Ephraim Randrianovana =

Bishop of Antananarivo

Ephraim Randrianovona was the second Bishop of Antananarivo from 1976 to 1983. Randrianovana studied for the priesthood at St Paul's College in Madagascar and was ordained in 1945. He was Dean of the diocese's cathedral from 1973 to 1975.

Religious titles
| Preceded by Jean Marcel | Bishop of Antananarivo; 1976 – 1978 | Succeeded by Remi Joseph Rabenirina |
