= Rainitsimbazafy =

Prime Minister of Madagascar from 1895 to 1896

5th Prime Minister of Madagascar
- In office 15 October 1895 – September 1896
- Monarch: Ranavalona III
- Preceded by: Rainilaiarivony
- Succeeded by: Rasanjy

Minister of Foreign Affairs
- In office 1864–1895
- Monarch: Ranavalona III

Personal details
- Born: before 1864 Kingdom of Imerina
- Died: after September 1896 Madagascar
- Party: Independent

Rainitsimbazafy (before 1864-after September 1895) was the Minister of Foreign Affairs under Queen Ranavalona III in the late 19th century in the Kingdom of Imerina. Following the French capture of the queen's palace at the capital city of Antananarivo in Autumn of 1895, the Merina Kingdom's Prime Minister for 31 years prior, Rainilaiarivony, was removed from his post and placed under house arrest by the French Governor-General. On October 15, 1895, Rainitsimbazafy was appointed Prime Minister of Madagascar in his place. The selection of Rainitsimbazafy was made by joint agreement between the queen and the French Governor-General, the latter viewing him as occupying a ceremonial role only and posing no threat to the newly established authority of France. Rainitsimbazafy was elderly at the time of his appointment to the post of Prime Minister. He was relieved of his post in September 1896.
