= Andafiavaratra Palace =

Coordinates: 18°55′14.94″S 47°31′58.81″E

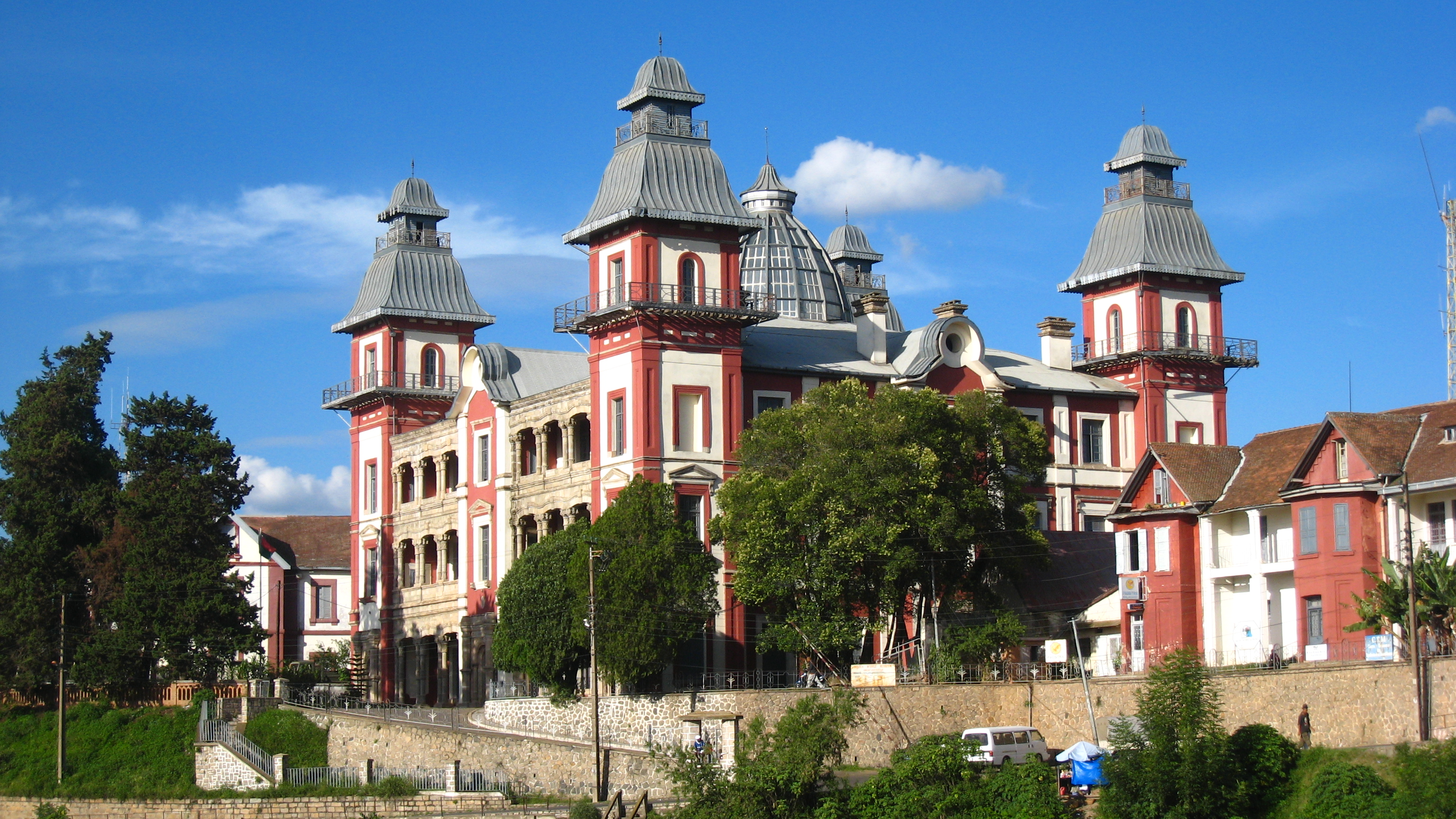
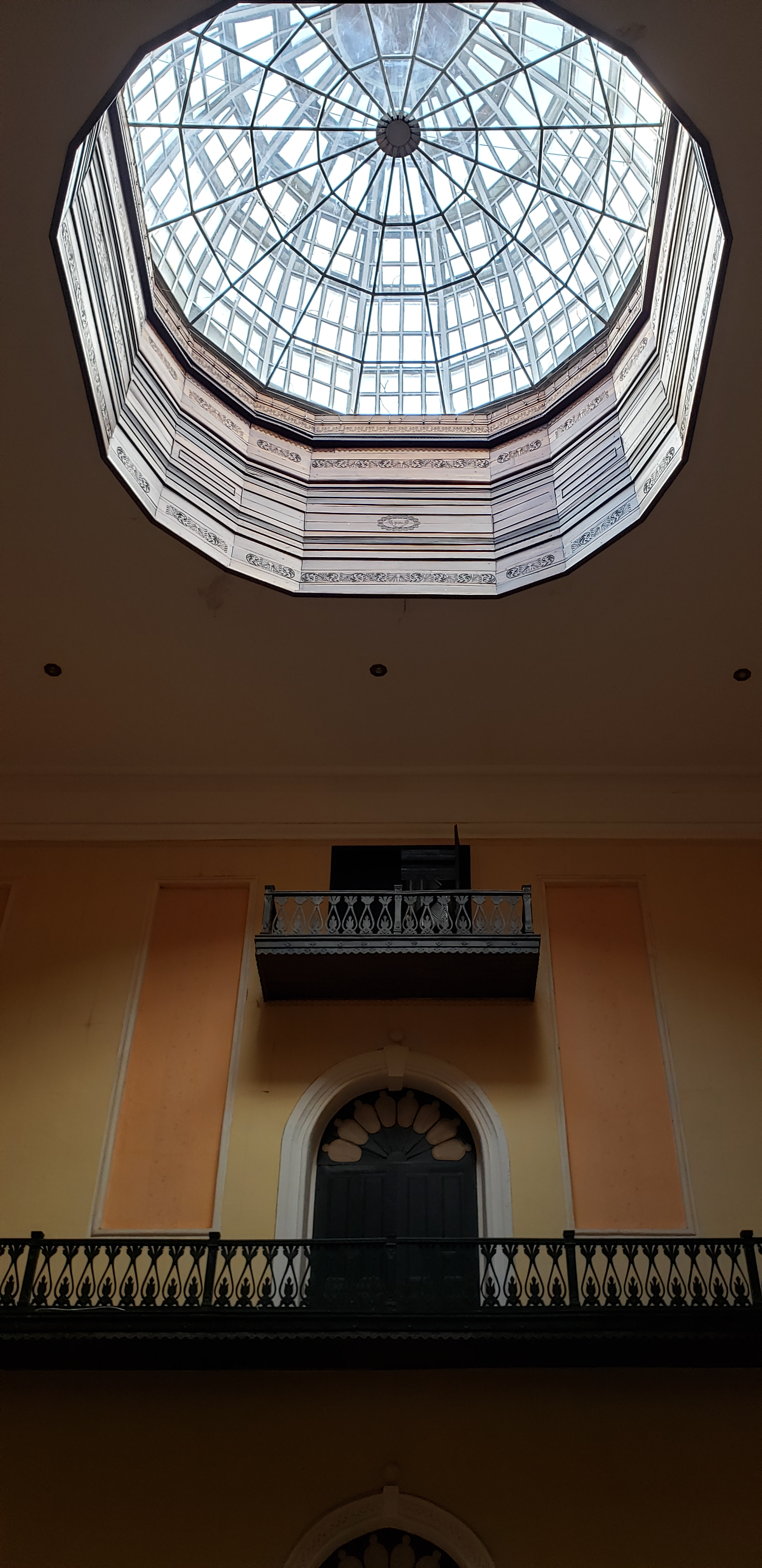
Palace of Andafiavaratra, home of the Prime Minister of Madagascar

The Andafiavaratra Palace, located on the highest hilltop of the capital city of Antananarivo, was the residence of Prime Minister Rainilaiarivony of Madagascar, who governed the island kingdom in the late 19th century. The building currently is now a museum and the estimated 1,466 objects of historical importance to the Kingdom of Madagascar that were rescued from the 1995 fire at the Rova of Antananarivo are housed here.
