= George Kestell-Cornish =

Malagasy Anglican bishop

George Kestell-Cornish was the third Anglican Bishop of Madagascar from 1919 until his death in 1925. His father, Kestell Kestell-Cornish, had been the first Bishop of Madagascar from 1874 to 1896.

He was born on 4 September 1856 and educated at Keble College, Oxford and ordained in 1880. He began his career with a curacy at St James’, Great Grimsby. He then followed his father to Madagascar and was Principal of two schools before being appointed Archdeacon then Bishop of the country. He was consecrated in St Paul's Cathedral on 18 October 1919.

He died on 23 June 1925.

== Notes ==
Anglican Communion titles
Preceded by Lanchester King	Anglican Bishop of Madagascar; 1919 – 1925	Succeeded by Ronald O'Ferrall
