= Helen Whitaker =

English Girl Guide leader (1890–1929)

Lady Helen Whitaker
- Lady Helen Whitaker from a 1922 newspaper
- Born: 12 August 1890
- Died: 2 August 1929 (aged 38); York, Yorkshire, England
- Other name: Lady Helen Newcome
- Occupation: Girl Guide leader
- Spouses: Hugh Sartorius Whitaker (m. 1913; div. 1922); Major-General H. W. Newcome (m. 1925; died 1929)

Lady Helen Whitaker (12 August 1890 – 2 August 1929) was county commissioner for Hampshire Girl Guides from 1917 to 1924 and Commissioner for British Guides Abroad. She was one of the earliest recipients of the Silver Fish Award, Girl Guiding's highest adult honour.

== Family and personal life ==
Lady Helen Alice Bootle-Wilbraham was the eldest daughter of Edward George Bootle-Wilbraham, 2nd Earl of Lathom and Lady Wilma Pleydell-Bouverie (1868–1930). She had two sisters. The family seat was Lathom House in Ormskirk, Lancashire.

She married Hugh Sartorius Whitaker at St Margaret's, Westminster in January 1913. They lived in Grove House, Lymington, Hampshire and had one son, Mark, born in 1915. They divorced in 1922. She was subsequently in a relationship with Ann Kindersley, a Girl Guide executive.

She married Major-General H. W. Newcome in 1925 and they travelled to India. Upon their return to England, they lived at the Army's Catterick Camp (now Catterick Garrison) in York where she was president of the Soldiers’ and Sailors’ Families Association. In 1926 she was working as a saleswoman in the decorating shop run by the Earl of Lathom. She was an accomplished horsewoman and a Sunday school teacher.

Whitaker died suddenly at Hipswell Lodge, Catterick Camp. Girl Guides acted as guards of honour during her funeral at St Oswald's Garrison Church. She was buried at St John the Evangelist Church in Hipswell, North Yorkshire. After her death, Lady Helen Newcombe House at Catterick Camp was named in her honour.

== Girl Guides ==
Whitaker was Hampshire's county commissioner from 1917 to 1924. In 1918 she was deputy chief commissioner for the south of England, assuming the role of chief commissioner for the south of England a year later.

She was recipient of Silver Fish Award, Girl Guiding's highest adult honour, in 1920. At this time she held several roles within Girl Guiding: Captain of Lymington Guides, Deputy Chief Commissioner of the Western Counties and headquarters secretary of the Catholic Women's League (CWL) Kindred Societies. CWL Kindred Societies were Catholic Guide units that were attached to the formal Guiding movement, but with their own standing committee, and with the approval of the Archbishop of Westminster. Being unable to attend some of the most significant Guiding church services, which were Anglican (non-Catholic), these kindred societies would organise their own. Whitaker attended the first such rally at the London Scottish House's Drill Hall in November 1920.

In 1923, together with Ann Kindersley, a district commissioner and executive within the Girl Guides’ Association's HQ, she wrote The Guiding Book: Dedicated to the Girlhood of Many Countries and to all those with a Heart Still Young. with a foreword written by HRH Princess Mary.

Guides and Guiding were her “pet subjects”, she would give regular talks on Girl Guiding's history, structure, aims and training.

By 1924 she was head of the publication department at the Girl Guides’ Association HQ in London. In the same year she attended an international camp at Foxlease attended by 1,100 Guides. As part of the programme she presented a Pageant of Womanhood, highlighting the contributions to history that a procession of remarkable women have made through the ages, beginning with Boadicea.

After moving to York in 1926, Whitaker became district commissioner for Bedale and Wensleydale Guides and a commissioner for British Guides Abroad, in which latter capacity she visited the British Rhine Garrison Guides in 1928, which was run for children of the Army of Occupation.

After her death, the publications department of the Girl Guides’ Association's HQ was named in her memory and the colours of the Rhine Garrison Guides were displayed there.

== Other ==
Whitaker was painted by society portrait artist, Ambrose McEvoy, in 1919.

She was on the committee of the Women Voters’ League for Licensing Reform in 1922. Its objectives included meeting the demands of women voters for information regarding the sale and supply of alcohol, and considering this from the point of view of women and children. In 1923, she was president of the Women's Total Abstinence Union.
