= Institut Supérieur Polytechnique Arsenal =

- Type: Private
- Location: Lot VF 36 Ambanidia, Antananarivo, Madagascar
- Website: http://www.institut-ispa.com/

Institut Supérieur Polytechnique Arsenal (also known as ISPA) is a Malagasy private university established in Moramanga (west coast of Madagascar in the province of Tamatave). After 6 years of existence, I.S.P.A. has established an annex in the capital, Antananarivo (school year 2012–2013).

== See also ==
- List of universities in Madagascar
- Education in Madagascar
