= Ann Kindersley =

English Girl Guide leader

- Born: 18 September 1899; Penang, Malaysia
- Died: 15 October 1973 (aged 74); Bemerton, Salisbury, England
- Other name: Ann O’Ferrall
- Occupation: Girl Guide leader
- Spouse: Ronald O'Ferrall
- Children: One daughter, one son

Ann Kindersley (18 September 1899 – 15 October 1973) was a Girl Guide leader, trainer and writer. She was Commissioner of Girl Guides for France, Belgium, Luxembourg and Italy.

== Personal life ==
Ann Molesworth Kindersley was born to John Molesworth Kindersley (1836–1907), a civil servant, and Olive Montagu Kindersley (1873–1955) a journalist, while the couple was posted at the Straits Settlement in Penang, Malaysia. She was the niece of Sir Robert Kindersley, 1st Baron Kindersley.

In the 1920s Kindersley was in a relationship with Helen Whitaker, a fellow Girl Guiding executive. By 1930 Kindersley was living in Fareham, Berkshire.

In 1931 she met Rt Rev Ronald Stanhope More O’Ferrall (1890–1973), the Bishop of Madagascar, also known as the "Boy Scout Bishop". They married on 17 April 1934 at Christ Church, Mayfair, moving to Madagascar after the wedding. They lived at the Bishop's house in Antananarivo and had two children. In 1940 O’Ferrall resigned from his position due to ill health and they returned to UK where they lived in Derby until 1953, moving to Cranham, Gloucestershire, then Hyde, Hampshire. Kindersley died in Bemerton, Salisbury.

== Girl Guides ==
In November 1919, Kindersley travelled to Belgium to train new Girl Guide leaders in methods of Guiding "as practiced in England". In 1920 she was involved in discussions with the Young People's Party of Germany in an attempt to establish the Guiding movement in the country. In the 1920s she established a Girl Guide company among English girls in Cologne, who were there as part of the Rhine Army Occupation. By 1924, she was the Girl Guides' District Commissioner for Newbury, a representative of Guides for Belgium and Luxembourg and also sat on the Girl Guide International Council. Between 1928 and 1930 she was Division Commissioner for Andover.

By 1930, in addition to her role on the Girl Guide International Council, Kindersley was a member of the Brighton Association of Girl Guides and Commissioner for Girl Guides in France, Belgium, Luxembourg and Italy. From 1930 to 1931, at the invitation of the Provincial Commissioner for the Bombay Presidency, she spent 18 months supervising the training and organisation of the Girl Guide movement in India. She travelled all over the country and, in her spare time, spent time working for various church societies. She returned to UK after her health "broke down".

In 1931 she stood in for the Chief Guide, Lady Baden-Powell, at the Sussex County Ranger Rally. In 1932, as Girl Guide Commissioner for Paris, together with Mrs Mark Kerr, she arranged a conference for European Guides in Paris. In 1933 she was Camp Advisor for Girl Guides in Belgium, France and Italy.

== Writing ==
- 1923 – she co-edited The Guiding Book with her partner, Lady Helen Whitaker. It was a compilation of articles by people including Rudyard Kipling, Dame Nelly Melba, GK Chesterton, Katherine Tynan and Sir Walford Davies, with a foreword by HRH Princess Mary.
- 1926 – she contributed to an anthology of prose and verse published by Lymington Girl Guides. Her translation of "Meditations of a Swiss Guide" appeared in a US newspaper.
- 1926 – her flapjack recipe featured in Stephen Graham's book The Gentle Art of Tramping
- 1938 – her article ‘'Notes on the Indian Idiom of English: Style, Syntax and Vocabulary'’ was published in Transactions of the Philological Society.

== Other ==
- In 1928 and 1929 she appeared on London and Daventry radio stations, presenting programmes Exploring Luxembourg, The Belgian Ardennes, Handicrafts in Colours and The Story without a Name, the last written by Kindersley.
- Kindersley owned Charlotte Bronte's toy tea service. In 1930 she showed it as part of the Period Models exhibition in London on behalf of the London Clubs of the Young Women's Christian Association.
- She established the League of Fellow Citizens of the Empire in 1933. She held a discussion between English and Indian women as part of the inaugural meeting regarding what could be done to further the common sharing of ideas for social services in terms of slum clearance, juvenile delinquency, health and sanitation, and how far broadcasting might be used to further these matters. Guests included social reformer, Dame Rachel Crowdy.
