= Tom Parfitt =

British bishop

Thomas Richards Parfitt (called Tom) was the sixth Anglican Bishop of Madagascar from 1952 to 1961.

== Biography ==
Parfitt was born on 24 May 1911, educated at St John's College, Oxford and ordained in 1935. He began his ordained ministry with curacies in New Mills and Rugby. During World War II he was a chaplain in the RNVR. In 1946 he became vicar of St Andrew's Derby and in 1950 (his last post before his ordination to the episcopate) the Rural Dean of Derby. Returning to England he was rector of Matlock until his retirement in 1980 and Assistant Bishop of Derby until he died on 10 December 1984.

Religious titles
| Preceded by Ronald O'Ferrall | Anglican Bishop of Madagascar; 1952 – 1961 | Succeeded by Jean Marcel |
