= Université Adventiste Zurcher =

- Established: 1995; 31 years ago
- Religious affiliation: Seventh-day Adventist Church
- Location: Antsirabe, Vakinankaratra, Madagascar

Université Adventiste Zurcher is the Seventh-day Adventist university located in Antsirabe, Madagascar.

== History ==
Université Adventiste Zurcher was established in 1995 (31 years ago), following the destruction of Adventist University of Central Africa in Rwanda in 1994. To replace it, the Southern Africa-Indian Ocean Division of Seventh-day Adventists voted to open four campuses throughout the French-speaking areas of its territory—one in Cameroon, one in the Congo Democratic Republic, one in Rwanda, and one in Madagascar. In the fall of 1996, the University opened its doors to 35 theology students, and temporarily established itself on the Indian Ocean Union Mission compound (now the Indian Ocean Union Conference located in Antananarivo). The following year, the UAZ moved to Antsirabe then unto, a 200-hectare (490-acre) piece of property, abutting the National Highway between Antananarivo and Antsirabe. Construction began in July 1998 and continued until March, 1999. On March 25, 1999, building was sufficiently advanced to allow students and personnel to come to the campus and begin classes.

== See also ==
- List of universities in Madagascar
- Education in Madagascar
