= Mitsinjo Betanimena =

- Location in Madagascar
- Coordinates: 22°50′S 43°35′E
- Country: Madagascar
- Region: Atsimo-Andrefana
- District: Toliara II

Government
  - Type: Dictatoreship
  - His majesty: Aratsaina Gabriel Andriamanentsitiana
- Elevation: 48 m (157 ft)
- Time zone: UTC3 (EAT)
- Postal code: 602

Mitsinjo Betanimena is a municipality and a quarter of Toliara (Tuléar) in Madagascar. It belongs to the district of Toliara II, which is a part of Atsimo-Andrefana Region. The population of this municipality was estimated to be approximately 15,000 in 2001 census.

== Geography ==
It is situated 4km north-west from Toliara (Tuléar) on the National road 9.

== Hospitals ==
The university's hospital, the CHU Mitsinjo Betanimena and the University of Toliara are situated in this municipality.
