= Lanchester King =

Malagasy Anglican bishop

George Lanchester King
- Bishop of Madagascar and Assistant Bishop to Diocese of Rochester
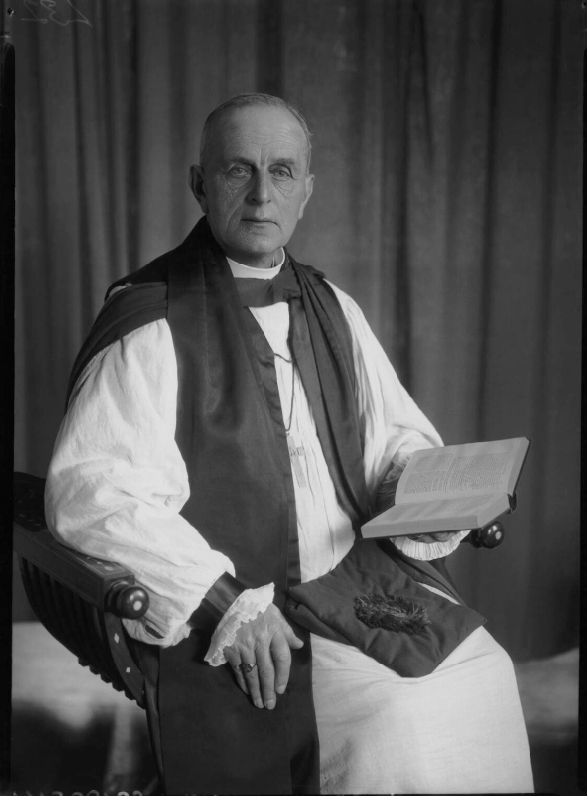
- George Lanchester King
- Church: Church of England

Personal details
- Born: George Lanchester King
- Education: Clare College, Cambridge

George Lanchester King was the second Anglican Bishop of Madagascar from 1899 to 1919.

He was born in 1860 and educated at Clare College, Cambridge. Ordained in 1884, he began his career with curacies at St Andrew, Tudhoe Grange and Holy Trinity, Gateshead. He was made deacon on Trinity Sunday 1884 (8 June) at St Andrew's Church, Bishop Auckland and ordained priest the following Trinity Sunday (31 May 1885) at Durham Cathedral – both times by J. B. Lightfoot, Bishop of Durham. He was then Vicar of St Mary, South Shields until 1899 when he was appointed to the colonial episcopate – he was consecrated a bishop on St Peter's Day (29 June) 1899 by Frederick Temple, Archbishop of Canterbury, at St Paul's Cathedral. On his return to England he was Secretary of the Society for Propagation of the Gospel; then a Canon Residentiary of Rochester Cathedral (1923–1940) and an Assistant Bishop of Rochester (1928–1939). He died in Woking on 26 January 1941.

Religious titles
Preceded by Kestell Kestell-Cornish	Anglican Bishop of Madagascar; 1899–1919	Succeeded by George Kestell-Cornish
