= Kestell Kestell-Cornish =

Malagasy Anglican bishop

Robert Kestell Kestell-Cornish (called Kestell; 1824 – 7 March 1909) was the first Bishop of Madagascar. from 1874 to 1896

He was born in 1824; educated at Winchester and Corpus Christi College, Oxford; and ordained in 1847. He began his career with a curacy at St Mary Fittleworth and later was Vicar of Landkey before his appointment to the colonial episcopate. Since the appointment of any Church of England bishop for Madagascar (i.e. by Queen Victoria) was politically inexpedient, Kestell-Cornish was consecrated by bishops of the Scottish Episcopal Church on 2 February 1874. On his return to England he was Rector of Down St Mary. His son, George Kestell-Cornish was a later Bishop of Madagascar.

The first Anglican cathedral in Antananarivo, Saint Lawrence's (in French Saint Laurent), was built during his time in 1883 on the hill of Ambohimanoro.

He died on 7 March 1909.

== Notes ==
Church of England titles
| New title | Anglican Bishop of Madagascar; 1874 – 1896 | Succeeded by Lanchester King |
