= St. Mark's Cathedral, Fianarantsoa =

Church in Fianarantsoa, Madagascar

St Mark's Cathedral, Fianarantsoa is an Anglican cathedral in Fianarantsoa, Madagascar. It is under the Anglican diocese of Fianarantsoa.

The cathedral was dedicated on 29 April 2018. The founding Bishop of Fianarantsoa is Gilbert Rateloson Rakotondravelo.

== See also ==
- List of cathedrals in Madagascar
