= Ronald O'Ferrall =

Anglican bishop of Madagascar

The Right Reverend Ronald O’Ferrall
- Diocese: Madagascar
- In office: 1926–1940
- Other posts: Assistant Bishop, Derby; Rector, Walton-on-Trent; Vicar, Repton; Provost, Derby; Assistant Bishop, Gloucester

Personal details
- Born: 11 September 1890
- Died: 10 December 1973 (aged 83) Bemerton, Salisbury
- Denomination: Anglican
- Spouse: Ann Kindersley
- Children: One daughter, one son
- Profession: Bishop, teacher
- Education: Trinity College, Cambridge

Ronald Stanhope More O’Ferrall was the fourth Anglican Bishop of Madagascar from 1926 until 1940.

O'Ferrall was born in 1890 and educated at Charterhouse School and Trinity College, Cambridge. He was ordained in 1915 and was a curate at Chesterfield Parish Church after which he was an assistant priest at St. George's Cathedral, Jerusalem and a housemaster at its adjacent school. He was a Universities' Mission to Central Africa missionary in Northern Rhodesia before his ordination to the episcopate. On his return to England he became an Assistant Bishop of Derby and was the rector of Walton-on-Trent and then the vicar of Repton as well as a teacher at the nearby Repton School. In 1947 he became Provost of Derby, a position he held until 1953. He then held two further incumbencies at Cranham, Gloucestershire (and Assistant Bishop of Gloucester) and Hyde, Hampshire before retiring in 1958.

He died on 10 October 1973.

Religious titles
Preceded by George Kestell-Cornish	Anglican Bishop of Madagascar; 1926–1940	Succeeded by Gerald Richard Vernon
