= Gilbert Rateloson Rakotondravelo =

Madagascan Anglican bishop

The Most Reverend Gilbert Rateloson Rakotondravelo
- Archbishop and Primate of the Province of the Indian Ocean; Bishop of Fianarantsoa
- Church: Church of the Province of the Indian Ocean
- Diocese: Fianarantsoa
- In office: 2024–present
- Predecessor: James Wong

Orders
- Consecration: 2003

Gilbert Rateloson Rakotondravelo is a Malagasy Anglican bishop. He was the elected and installed as the founding bishop of the Anglican Diocese of Fianarantsoa, Madagascar, in the Church of the Province of the Indian Ocean in 2003. In 2018, he oversaw the completion of St. Mark's Cathedral in Fianarantsoa. He succeeded James Wong as the province's archbishop and primate in 2024.

Anglican Communion titles
New title	Bishop of Fianarantsoa; Since 2003	Incumbent
Preceded by James Wong	Archbishop and Primate of the Province of the Indian Ocean; Since 2024	Incumbent
