= Samoela Jaona Ranarivelo =

Ranarivelo Samoela Jaona (born 25 January 1962) is the current Malagasy Anglican bishop of the Diocese of Antananarivo. He was consecrated on the 29 June 2008 at the cathedral of Saint Laurent's in Ambohimanoro, and is the fourth bishop of Antananarivo.

He currently chairs the central office of the Eklesia Episkopaly Malagasy (Malagasy Episcopal Church) that unites the Anglican dioceses in Madagascar. The Diocese of Antananarivo is within the Anglican Church of the Indian Ocean Province.

Ranarivelo was educated at the Ecole Supérieure Polytechnique Antsiranana and Vontovorona. He also studied theology at Institut Supérieur de Théologie et de Philosophie à Madagascar, now the Catholic University of Madagascar, Ambatoroka. He continued with studies in philosophy at the University of Toliara. He was made deacon in 1995 and ordained as an Anglican priest in 1998 at Cathédrale St Laurent. He was parish priest at the Ankilifaly Anglican church in Toliara before continuing his theological studies at the Kwazulu Natal University, Pietermaritzburg, South Africa.

Anglican Communion titles
Preceded by Remi Joseph Rabenirina	Bishop of Antananarivo; 2008– Present	Succeeded by...
