= Santosh Marray =

Guyanese bishop

The Right Reverend Santosh Marray
- Bishop of Easton
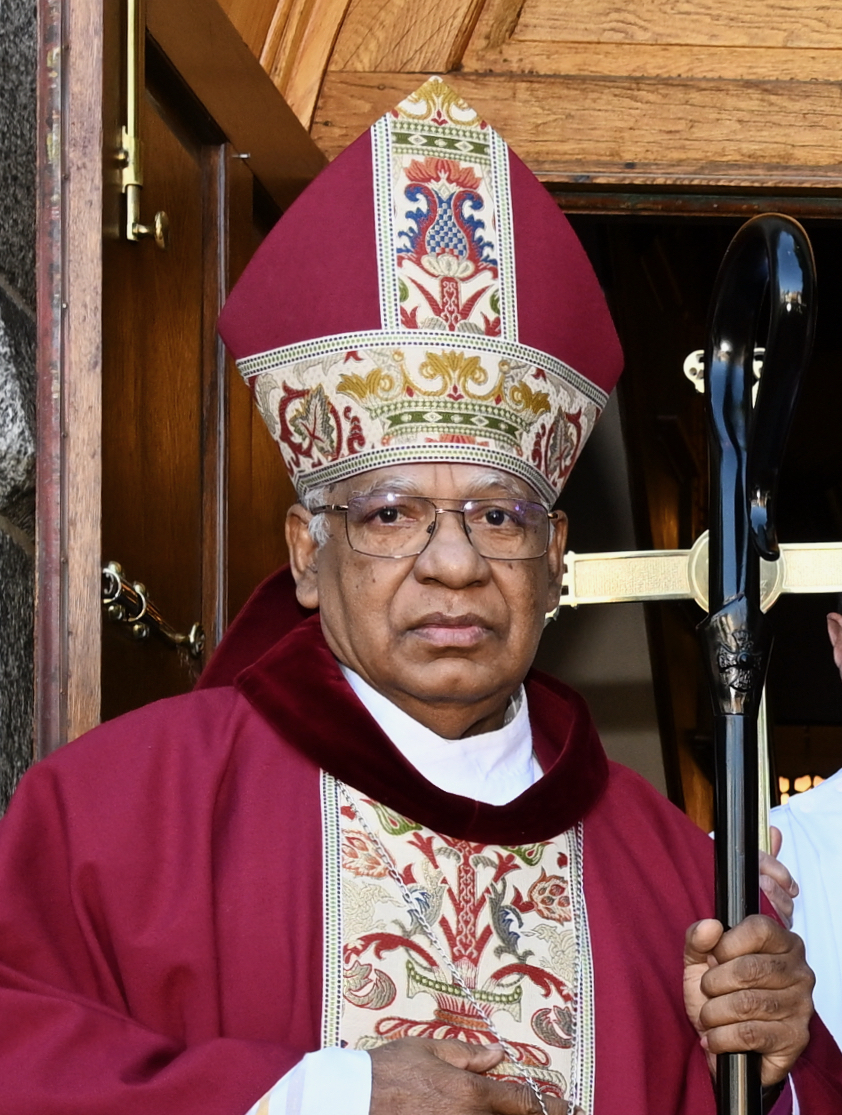
- Marray at the 350th anniversary service for Christ Church St. Michaels in 2022.
- Church: Episcopal Church
- Diocese: Easton
- Elected: June 11, 2016
- In office: 2016–present
- Predecessor: James J. Shand
- Previous posts: Bishop of Seychelles (2005-2008); Assistant Bishop of East Carolina (2009-2012); Assistant Bishop of Alabama (2012-2016)

Orders
- Ordination: January 1981 (deacon); December 1981 (priest)
- Consecration: April 5, 2005 by Remi Rabenirina

Personal details
- Born: 1957 (age 68–69) Guyana
- Denomination: Anglican
- Parents: Gurdat & Chandrawati Marray
- Spouse: Nalini ‘Lynn’
- Children: 2

Santosh Kumar Marray (born 1957) is the eleventh and current bishop of the Episcopal Diocese of Easton. Before this, he served as assistant bishop for both the Diocese of Alabama (2012-2016) and the Diocese of East Carolina (2009-2012). Prior to that, he was Bishop of Seychelles. He was ordained as a priest in 1981, and served in this capacity in Florida, Guyana, and the Bahamas before being consecrated as bishop.

== Biography ==
Bishop Marray is the third of six children born to the late Gurdat and Chandrawati Marray in Guyana, South America. He was reared as a Hindu, the traditional religion of his parents and ancestors, and converted to Christianity when he was 16 years old while attending a small, rural Anglican church.

He earned a B.A. in theology from the University of West Indies, and a diploma in pastoral studies from Codrington College in Barbados. At Codrington, he was awarded the Bishop Coleridge Prize for the best graduating student in theology. He earned his D.Min. degree from Colgate Rochester Divinity School/Bexley Hall Episcopal Seminary in Rochester, New York, and went on to earn his Master of Laws in canon law from the Cardiff University Centre for Law and Religion in the United Kingdom. He also holds a master's in sacred theology from General Theological Seminary in New York.

In September 2008, the board of governors of Bexley Hall Episcopal Seminary in Columbus, Ohio, awarded Marray the degree of Doctor of Divinity (Honoris Causa) in recognition of his contribution to the church in various parts of the worldwide Anglican Communion.

Marray was ordained as deacon at St. George's Cathedral in Georgetown, Guyana, in January 1981 and, eleven months later, as priest of All Saints’ Church in New Amsterdam, Guyana. He has since served parishes in Guyana, in the Bahamas, Florida and the Seychelles, where he was ordained Bishop of Seychelles.

He was a member of the Anglican Communion Covenant Design Group, charged by the Archbishop of Canterbury to develop and draft an Anglican Covenant for the communion, and he serves the wider Anglican Communion as a pastoral visitor for the Archbishop of Canterbury.

In September, 2012, Bishop Marray accepted the call to the position of Assistant Bishop of the Episcopal Diocese of Alabama, under the Right Reverend John McKee Sloan.

Marray is married to Nalini, a former schoolteacher; the couple live in Easton. They have two adult children, a daughter, Amanda, and a son, Ingram, who is married to Tenille Barton.

In November 2024, Marray announced that he would retire in 2026, setting in motion an election process for a bishop coadjutor.

== See also ==
- List of Episcopal bishops of the United States
- Historical list of the Episcopal bishops of the United States
