= Ian Ernest =

Mauritian Anglican bishop (born 1954)

The Most Reverend Ian Ernest GCSK
- Archbishop and Primate of the Province of the Indian Ocean
- Church: Church of the Province of the Indian Ocean
- Diocese: Mauritius
- In office: 2006–2017
- Predecessor: Remi Rabenirina
- Successor: James Wong
- Other posts: Director of the Anglican Centre in Rome and Representative of the Archbishop of Canterbury to the Holy See (2019–2025)
- Previous post: Bishop of Mauritius (2001–2019)

Orders
- Ordination: 1985
- Consecration: 2001 by Remi Rabenirina

Personal details
- Born: August 30, 1954 (age 72)
- Spouse: Kamla Ernest
- Education: University of Madras

Gerald James Ian Ernest (born 30 August 1954) is a Mauritian Anglican bishop. In 2001 he was consecrated as the 15th bishop of Mauritius. From 2006 to 2017 he was archbishop of the Province of the Indian Ocean. From October 2019 to January 2025, he was the Archbishop of Canterbury's Personal Representative to the Holy See and Director of the Anglican Centre in Rome.

Ernest was educated at the University of Madras and ordained an Anglican priest in 1985.

In 2008 he was awarded the Cross of St Augustine, the second-highest international award for outstanding service to the Anglican Communion, by the Archbishop of Canterbury.

Anglican Communion titles
Preceded by Luc Rex Victor Donat	Bishop of Mauritius; 2001– 2019	Succeeded by Joseph Sténio André
Preceded by Remi Rabenirina	Archbishop of the Indian Ocean; 2006 – 2017	Succeeded by James Wong
Preceded by Bernard Ntahoturi	Director of the Anglican Centre in Rome and Representative of the Archbishop of Canterbury to the Holy See; 2019 – 2025	Succeeded by Anthony Ball
