= George Briggs (bishop) =

George Cardell Briggs CMG OGS (6 September 1910 – 15 March 2004) was the first Bishop of The Seychelles.

Born in Warrington, Briggs was educated at Worksop College and Sidney Sussex College, Cambridge. After studying at Cuddesdon College he was ordained deacon in 1934 and priest in 1935. He was a curate of St Alban's, Stockport until 1937 when he became a missionary priest in the Diocese of Masabi, Tanzania. In 1939 he became a member of the Oratory of the Good Shepherd. He was the Archdeacon of Newala from 1955 to 1964 and then Rector of St Alban's Dar-es-Salaam until 1969 when he became Warden of St Cyprian's Theological College, Masasi, his last post before ordination to the episcopate.

He became Bishop of the Seychelles in 1973.

He was created a CMG in 1979.

He resigned his See in 1979 and returned to England as Assistant Bishop of Derby; he went to Mauritius the next year. He later became an assistant priest in Mwatara, Tanzania, and an honorary assistant bishop in the Diocese of Worcester until 1990.

Briggs died in 2004, aged 93.
