= Keith Benzies =

Anglican bishop in Madagascar

Keith John Benzies OBE (19 June 1938 – 12 May 2002) was an Anglican bishop in Madagascar. He was the Bishop of Antsiranana from 1982 until his death in 2002.

== Early life ==
Benzies was born in Stepps, Lanarkshire, the son of John Young Benzies, a professor of thermodynamics, (1914-1994) and his wife Jeanette Evelyn (née Beckett) (1913-1956). Both his mother and younger brother Roger died in the 1956 BOAC Argonaut accident at Kano Airport in Nigeria. Benzies was educated at the University of Glasgow, obtaining a MA in Czech and French in 1960.

== Clerical career ==
Benzies trained for ordination at Salisbury Theological College, and was ordained deacon in 1962 and priest in 1963. He served his title at St Nicholas's Church, Hull (1962-1966).

For his second curacy, Benzies went to Madagascar as a USPG missionary. He was Vice-Principal of St Paul's Theological College, Ambatoharanana (1966-1969) and then Principal (1969-1979) as well as being concurrently, in part, Chancellor (1970-1975). He ran a home for 30 destitute boys. He was elected as the successor to the Rt Rev Gabriel Josoa as Bishop of Antsiranana in 1982. He was awarded an OBE in 1993.

== Personal life ==
Benzies died in office in 2002, aged 63, from malaria. He was unmarried, but had many adopted children whom he put through education and into employment.
