= James Wong (bishop) =

Mauritian-Seychellois archbishop

The Most Reverend James Wong
- Archbishop and Primate of the Province of the Indian Ocean; Bishop of the Seychelles
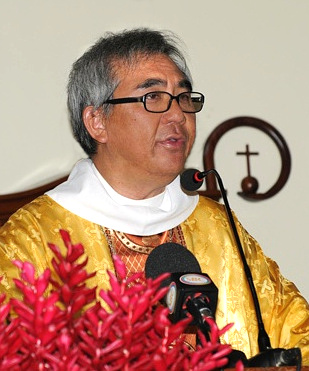
- Church: Anglican Communion – Province of the Indian Ocean
- Predecessor: Ian Ernest
- Successor: Gilbert Rateloson Rakotondravelo

Orders
- Ordination: 1983
- Consecration: 2009 by Ian Ernest

Personal details
- Born: January 13, 1960 (age 66) Rodrigues, Mauritius

James Richard Wong Yin Song (born 13 January 1960) is a Mauritian-Seychellois Anglican bishop. He was the fourth bishop of The Seychelles from 2009 to 2025 the archbishop and primate of the Anglican Church of the Province of the Indian Ocean from 2017 to 2024.

== Ecclesiastical career ==
Wong was ordained an Anglican priest in 1983. He was afterwards the archdeacon of Mauritius and the rector of St Thomas' Beau Bassin. He was elected the fourth bishop of the Diocese of the Seychelles in 2009. Wong was granted Seychelles citizenship on 11 May 2017. He was elected archbishop of the Province of the Indian Ocean, at the provincial synod, held at St. Andrew's Church, Quatre-Bornes, Mauritius, on 26 August 2017, assuming office the following day.

Wong is a supporter of the Anglican realignment. He attended GAFCON III, in Jerusalem, on 17–22 June 2018.

Wong retired as archbishop in December 2024 and was succeeded by Gilbert Rateloson Rakotondravelo. In April 2025, having reached the retirement age of 65, he stepped down as diocesan bishop.

Anglican Communion titles
Preceded by Santosh Marray	Bishop of Seychelles; 2009–2025	Succeeded by Danny Elizabeth
Preceded by Ian Ernest	Archbishop of the Indian Ocean; 2017–2024	Succeeded by Gilbert Rateloson Rakotondravelo
