= James Seth (bishop) =

Anglican bishop in Madagascar

James Seth (11 February 1913 – 8 April 1975) was an Anglican bishop in Madagascar. He was the first bishop of Tamatave (now Toamasina) from its creation in 1969 until his death in 1975.

== Early life ==
Seth was born posthumously in Madagascar in 1913, the son of Baba Seth, a teacher, and Christine Tatelo. Seth was the grandson of Marie Celeste, the first Christian convert of the Anglican mission in Tamatave. He was educated at mission schools and at a government school.

== Clerical career ==
He trained for ordination at St Paul's Theological College, Antananarivo, and St Boniface College, Warminster, which trained ordinands specifically for missionary work. He was ordained deacon in 1942 and priest in 1945. He served his title at Ampasimanjeva (1942-45) and was then Priest-in-Charge (1945-49), before becoming Priest-in-Charge of Tamatave (1949-61).

He was consecrated bishop in the chapel at Lambeth Palace in 1961 and was then an assistant bishop in what was then the Diocese of Madagascar. At the time of the announcement of his appointment as a bishop, he was Rural Dean of Tamatave. On the splitting of the Diocese into three dioceses in 1969, he became the inaugural bishop of the Diocese of Tamatave. He died in 1975, and was succeeded by Samuel Rafanomezane, Archdeacon of Tamatave. After his death both the town and diocese of Tamatave were renamed Toamasina.

== Civic honours and legacy ==
Seth remained in post during the 1947 Malagasy Uprising. He was made an Officer of L’Ordre National de la République Malgache in 1964.

A school in Toamasina is named after Seth, as is a street.
