= University of Toamasina =

Coordinates: 18.1534°S 49.4127°E

The University of Toamasina (French: Université de Tamatave) is a public university in Toamasina, Madagascar. The university campus is located in Barikadimy west of the city of Toamasina, the capital of Atsinanana on the east side of Madagascar.

The school was formerly part of the University of Madagascar system, along with public universities in Antananarivo, Antsiranana, Mahajanga, Toliara and Fianarantsoa. In 1988 (38 years ago) that system was reorganized and the member schools became separate institutions.

It runs the CEREL Museum.

== Organisation ==
The university comprises four faculties and seven institutes:

- Confucius Institute
- Faculty of Law, Economics and Management
- Faculty of Science and Technology
- Faculty of Arts and Humanities
- Faculty of Medicine
- National Higher School of Customs
- Higher Institute of Environmental Science and Sustainable Development
- Higher Regional Institute of Technology and the East Coast
- Higher Regional Institute of Technology of Atsinanana
- Higher Regional Institute of Technology of Alaotra Mangory Ambatondrazaka
- Institute of Tourism, Heritage and Territory

== See also ==
- List of universities in Madagascar
- Education in Madagascar
