= List of universities in Madagascar =

This is a list of universities in Madagascar.

== Universities ==
- Arsenal Higher Polytechnic Institute
- Catholic University of Madagascar
- Higher Institute of Communication, Business, and Management of Madagascar
- Higher Institute of Technology of Antananarivo
- Higher Institute of Theology and Philosophy of Madagascar
- Higher Polytechnic Institute of Madagascar
- Higher Vocational Agricultural School of Bevalala
- Madagascar Institute of Political Studies
- National Institute of Public Health
- Reformed University of Madagascar
- University of Antananarivo
- University of Antsiranana or University of North Madagascar
- University of Fianarantsoa
- University of Mahajanga
- University of Toamasina
- University of Toliara
- Zurcher Adventist University

=== Seminaries ===
- Major Seminary of Antananarivo
- Lutheran Graduate School of Theology

== Former universities ==
- University of Madagascar
