= Remi Rabenirina =

Malagasy Anglican archbishop

Remi Joseph Rabenirina (born 6 March 1938) is a former Malagasy Anglican archbishop. He was Archbishop of the Church of the Province of the Indian Ocean, from 1995 to 2005.

Rabenirina was educated at the University of Madagascar. After a brief career as a school teacher, he was ordained an Anglican priest in 1967. He was parish priest at St James’ Toamasina and then held incumbencies at St Matthew's Antsiranana and St John's Ambohimangakely.

In 1984, he was elected Bishop of Antananarivo, retiring in 2008; and in 1995 Archbishop of the Indian Ocean, resigning in 2005. An author he is Chevalier, Officier et Commandeur de l’Ordre National (Malagasy).

Anglican Communion titles
| Preceded by Ephraim Randrianovana | Bishop of Antananarivo; 1984– 2008 | Succeeded by Samoela Jaona Ranarivelo |
| Preceded by French Kitchener Chang-Him | Archbishop of the Indian Ocean; 1995 – 2005 | Succeeded by Gerald James Ian Ernest |
