= University of Toliara =

University in Madagascar

Coordinates: 23.3536°S 43.6761°E

Université de Toliara
- Type: Public
- Established: 1971; 55 years ago
- Chancellor: Dr Andriamanantena Razafiharison
- Students: 4000
- Location: Toliara in Mitsinjo Betanimena, Madagascar
- Website: www.univ-toliara.mg

The University of Toliara is historically the oldest center for higher education, founded in 1971 after the decentralization of the University of Madagascar center. The university campus is located in Maninday 5 km east of the city of Toliara, the capital of Atsimo-Andrefana on the southwest side of Madagascar. This university teaches Humanities and Social Science, Science, Philosophy, and Management (the latter located next to the Cedratom).

The university operates the CEDRATOM Museum.

== Faculties and Institutions ==
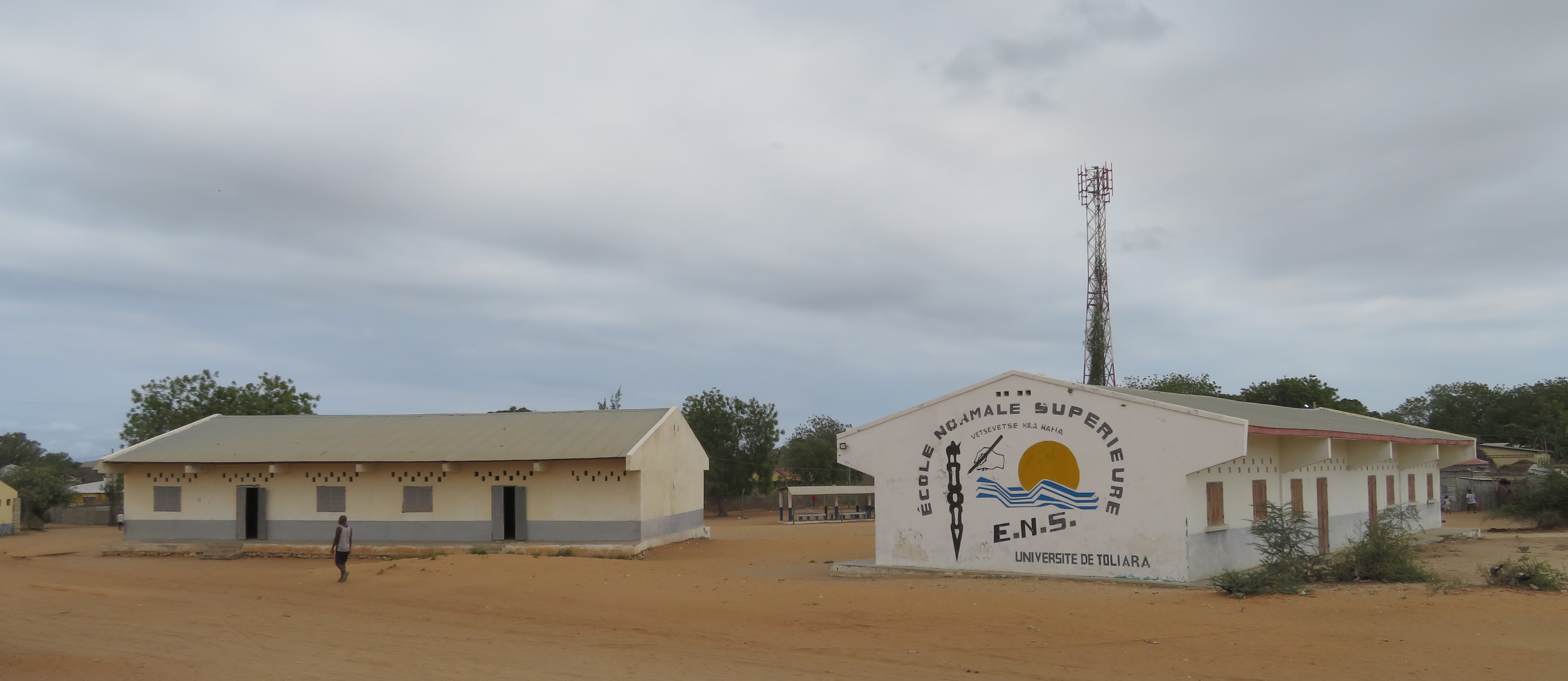
University of Toliara

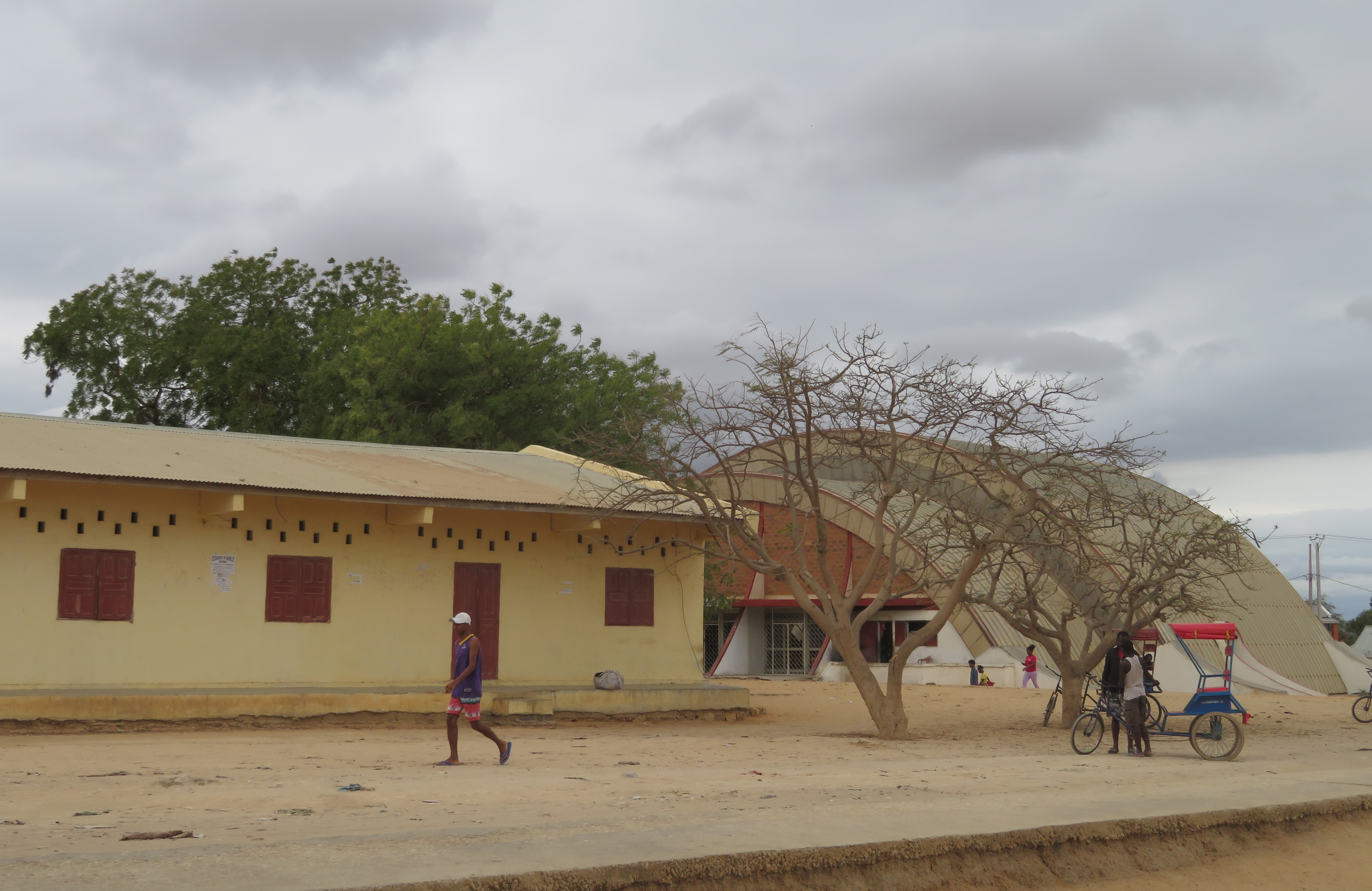
Maninday Campus

- Ecole Normale Superieur (ENS)
- Insitut Superieur Technologique (IST)
- IHSM
- Faculte de Lettres
- Faculte de Biologie

== Notable alumni ==
- Samoela Jaona Ranarivelo, Anglican Bishop of Antananarivo

== See also ==
- List of universities in Madagascar
- Education in Madagascar
