= Doctoral school =

In France, a doctoral school (école doctorale) is an educational structure similar in focus to a graduate school but restricted to PhD level. The concept was created in 2000. Doctoral schools have the responsibility of providing students with structured doctoral training in a disciplinary field. Each university will have different doctoral schools, relative to their main fields of research. A doctoral school can be shared between two or more universities. Some universities have also regrouped their Doctoral schools into a Doctoral college.

Admission to a doctoral program requires a master's degree, both research-oriented and disciplinary focused. High marks are required (typically a "très bien honour", similar to a cum laude), but the acceptance is linked to a decision of the School Academical Board.

A large share of the funding offered to junior researchers is channeled through the école doctorale, mainly in the shape of three-year "doctoral fellowships" (contrats doctoraux). These fellowships are awarded after submitting a biographical information, undergraduate and graduate transcripts where applicable, letters of recommendation, and research proposal, then an oral examination by an Academical Committee.
