= Church of the Province of the Indian Ocean =

Province of the Anglican Communion

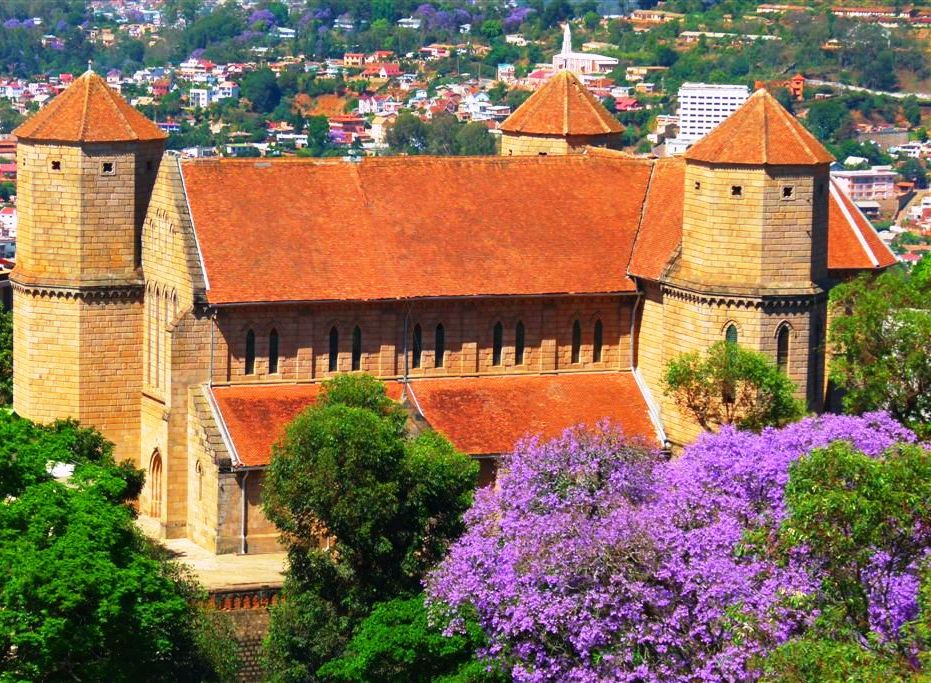
- The Cathedral of St Lawrence in Antananarivo, one of the oldest permanent Anglican churches in Madagascar.
- Classification: Protestant
- Orientation: Anglican
- Scripture: Holy Bible
- Theology: Anglican doctrine
- Polity: Episcopal
- Primate: Gilbert Rateloson Rakotondravelo
- Associations: Anglican Communion, Global South
- Territory: Madagascar, Mauritius and the Seychelles
- Members: 600,000 (2024)

The Church of the Province of the Indian Ocean is a province of the Anglican Communion. It covers the islands of Madagascar, Mauritius and the Seychelles. The current Archbishop and Primate is Gilbert Rateloson Rakotondravelo, Bishop of Fianarantsoa. According to the Church of England Yearbook, the province has more than 600,000 members.

The Church of the Province of the Indian Ocean is a member of the Global South and the Global Anglican Future Conference, and has been involved in the Anglican realignment. Archbishop James Wong attended GAFCON III, in Jerusalem, on 17–22 June 2018, and GAFCON IV in Kigali, on 17-21 April 2023. The province was represented at the event by a ten-member delegation, six from Madagascar and four from the Seychelles. The church has ordained women to the diaconate since 2002 and to the priesthood since 2006.

== Dioceses ==
=== Madagascan dioceses ===
==== Diocese of Antananarivo ====
The Bishop of Antananarivo has been the Ordinary of the Anglican Church in Antananarivo in the Indian Ocean since the diocese's erection in 1969. The current bishop is Samoela Jaona Ranarivelo.

==== Diocese of Antsiranana ====
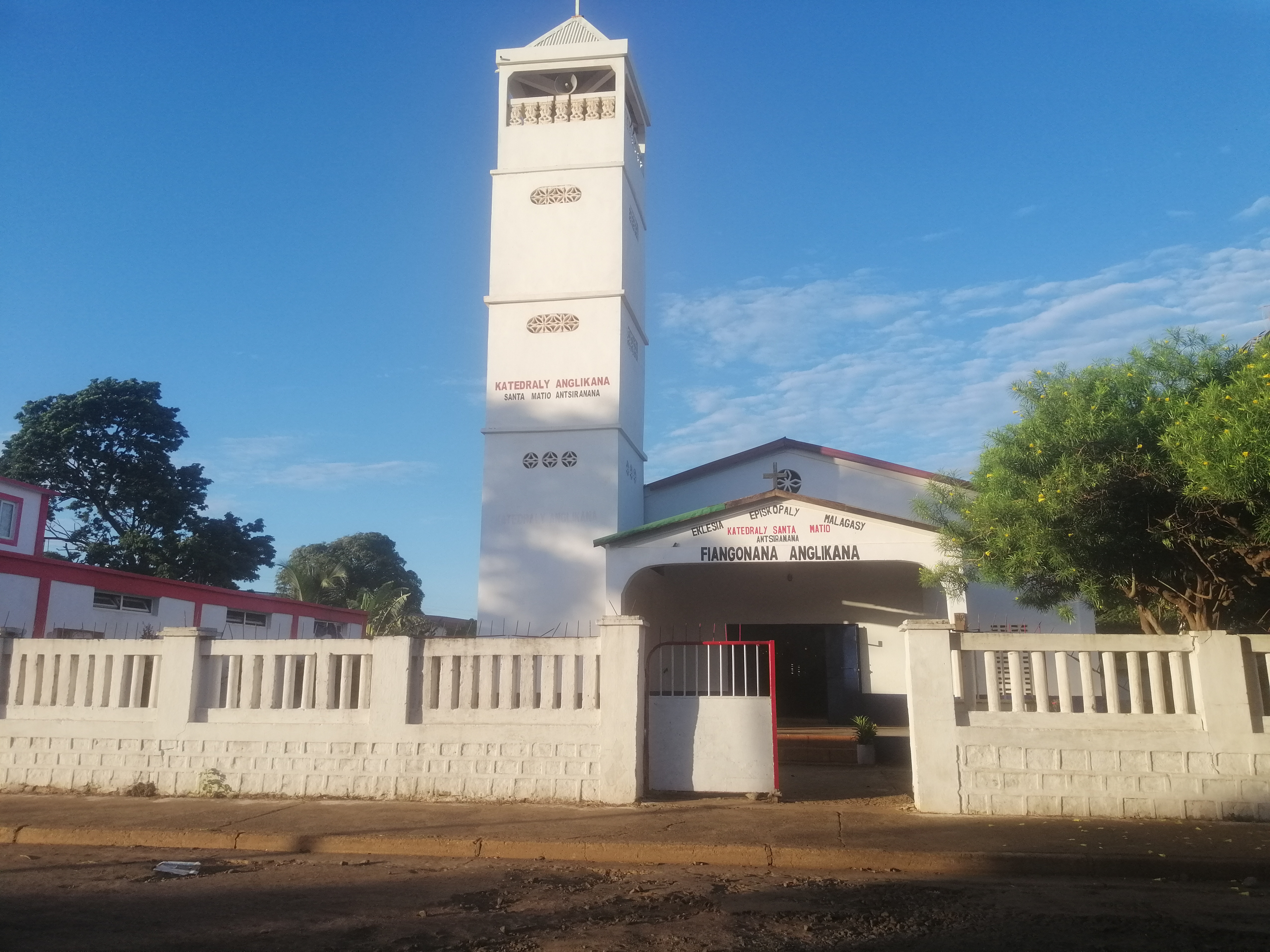
St Matthew's Anglican Church in Antsiranana.

Bishops of Antsiranana have included Gabriel Josoa (until 1982), Keith Benzies (1982 to his death in 2002), Roger Chung Po Chuen (until 2012), Oliver Simon (2012–2015) and Théophile Botomazava (2015-2021).

==== Diocese of Fianarantsoa ====
The diocese of Fianarantsoa was established in 2003, with and Gilbert Rateloson Rakotondravelo as its first and only bishop as of 2024. He succeeded James Wong as primate in 2024, becoming the second Malagasy primate of the church. Since 2018, the diocese's cathedral has been St. Mark's Cathedral.

==== Diocese of Mahajanga ====
Jean-Claude Andrianjafimanana was the first Anglican Bishop of Mahajanga starting in 2003. He was succeeded by Hall Speers from 2019 to 2024. In 2024, a Canadian priest of the Anglican Church in North America, Darrell Critch, was elected and consecrated as the third missionary bishop for the diocese.

==== Diocese of Toamasina ====
When Grosvenor Miles was appointed assistant bishop of Madagascar in 1938, he based himself in Tamatave, with the intention that this would become a diocesan see when the diocese of Madagascar was divided up; but, in fact, the diocese of Tamatave was not created until 1969. It was subsequently renamed the diocese of Toamasina. The inaugural bishop was James Seth from 1969 until his death in 1975. Jean-Paul Solo has been the (Anglican) Bishop of Toamasina, since before 2011.

==== Diocese of Toliara ====
Todd McGregor was elected in 2006 to become a suffragan/assistant bishop over the Toliara (Tuléar) missionary area of the Diocese of Antananarivo, to prepare that area to become a diocese. On 21 April 2013, the new Diocese of Toliara was erected out of Antananarivo diocese and McGregor became the first bishop diocesan. On 14 March 2021, the Rt Rev Dr Samitiana Jhonson Razafindralambo, formerly the assistant bishop, was elected the next bishop and installed as the 2nd Bishop of Toliara on 25 April 2021.

=== Diocese of Mauritius ===
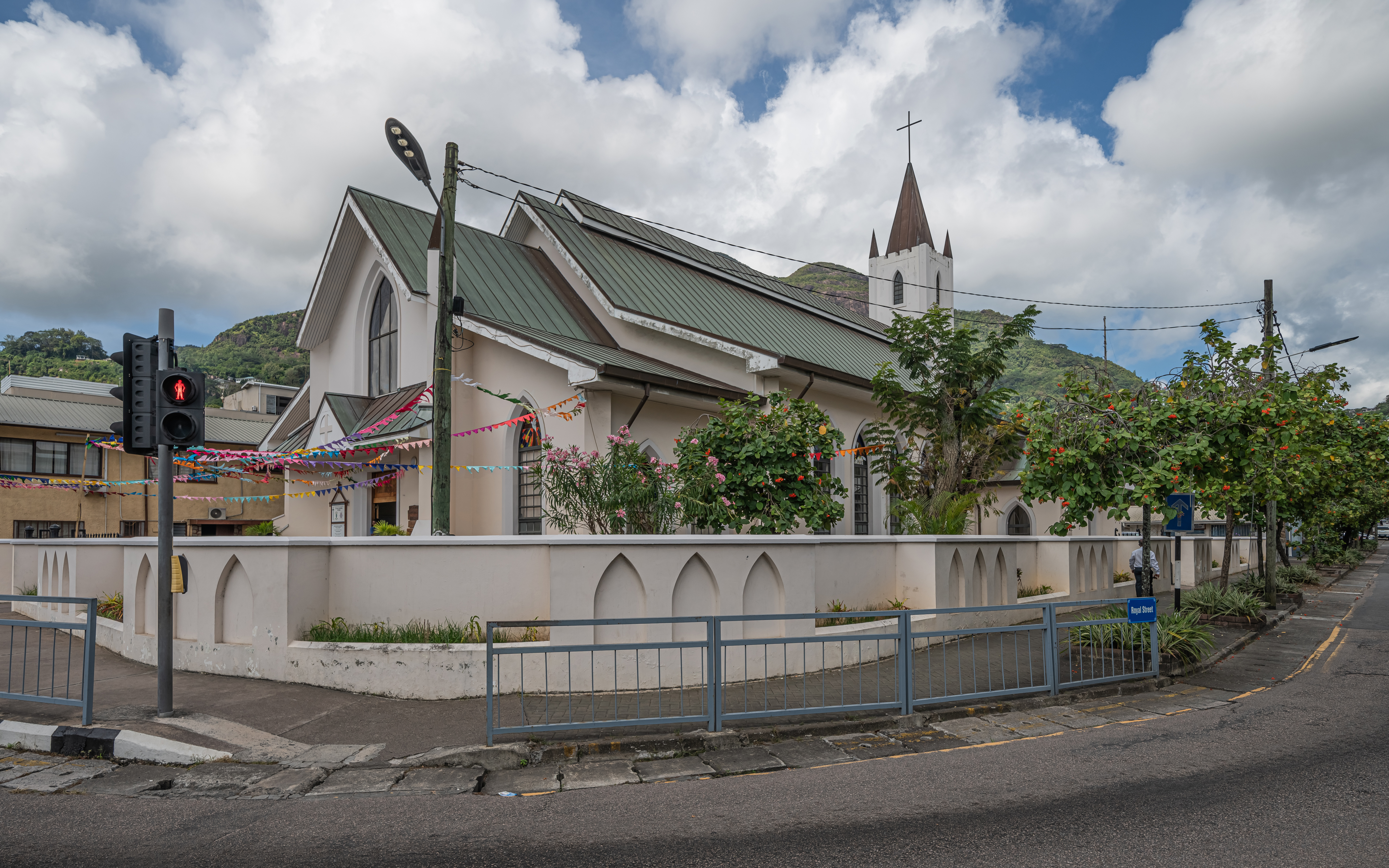
St. Paul's Anglican Cathedral in Victoria, Seychelles.

See: Bishop of Mauritius.

== Archbishops ==
- 1973–1976 Edwin Curtis
- 1978–1983 Trevor Huddleston
- 1984–1995 French Chang-Him
- 1995–2005 Remi Rabenirina
- 2006–2017 Ian Ernest
- 2017–2024 James Wong
- 2024–present Gilbert Rateloson Rakotondravelo
