= Anglican Bishop of Madagascar =

The Bishop of Madagascar was the Ordinary of the Anglican Church in Madagascar from 1874 until the Diocese was split into three in 1969.

== Assistant bishops ==
Grosvenor Miles was an assistant bishop of the diocese from 1938 to 1960. Jean Marcel was an assistant bishop from 1956 until he became diocesan bishop in 1961.
