= Diocese of Kuching =

Diocese of Kuching Keuskupan Kuching dan Brunei Darussalam
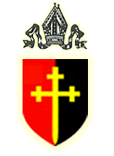

Location
- Country: Malaysia & Brunei
- Territory: Sarawak and Brunei Darussalam
- Ecclesiastical province: South East Asia
- Archdeaconries: 6
- Subdivisions: 3
- Headquarters: Bishop's House, McDougall Road, 93000 Kuching, Sarawak

Statistics
- Area: 19,173 km^{2} (7,403 sq mi)
- Population: Total: (as of 2021); ~300,000
- Parishes: 60

Information
- First holder: Francis Thomas McDougall
- Denomination: Anglican
- Established: Borneo Church Mission 1855, current establishment in 1962
- Diocese: Kuching
- Cathedral: St. Thomas' Cathedral
- Patron saint: Saint Thomas the Apostle and Saint Mary the Virgin
- Language: English, Iban, Bidayuh, Mandarin and Malay

Current leadership
- Lord Bishop of Kuching: Donald Jute
- Assistant bishops: Andy Shie; Solomon Cheong; Aeries Sumping Jingan; Nelson Ugas Bulang

The Diocese of Kuching is a diocese of the Anglican Church of the Province of South East Asia that covers the Region of Sarawak in Malaysia and Brunei (Sabah is a separate diocese). Founded in 1962, the see was originally established as the Bishopric of Sarawak linked to the Diocese of Labuan in 1855. The current bishop is the Right Revd. Datuk Danald Jute, the 14th Bishop of Kuching (Sarawak and Negara Brunei Darussalam), who was consecrated on 13 August 2017, replacing the Right Revd. Datuk Bolly Lapok. His seat is at St. Thomas's Cathedral, Kuching.

== History ==
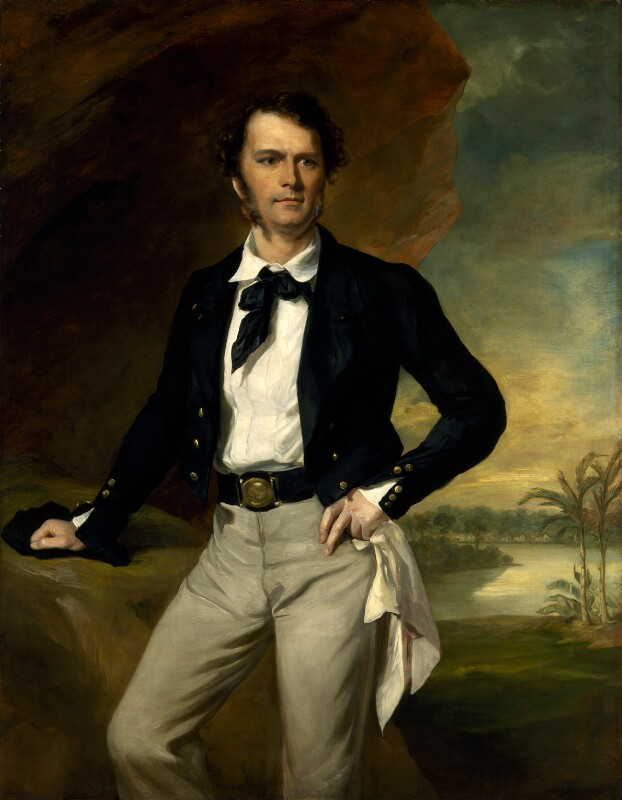
James Brooke, Rajah of Sarawak brought in missionaries in 1848.

=== The first sixty years ===
An Anglican mission, called the Borneo Church Mission, was established in 1846 and the Anglican Church began in Sarawak on 29 June 1848, when a party of missionaries arrived at the invitation of James Brooke, Rajah of Sarawak. Francis Thomas McDougall who led the group was deemed suitable for the job because he was a doctor as well as a priest.

The Rajah gave the missionaries a piece of land on which to build their base. The land was used to build a church, which was to serve as pro-cathedral for many years, as well as a school which later grew into St. Thomas' and St. Mary's, and also a dispensary.

It was soon realised that the Church in the Rajah's territory would be better administered as a bishopric. The Society for the Propagation of the Gospel supported the proposal and contributed a sum of £5,000 towards the endowment. However, the political conventions of the day ruled that no Anglican diocese could be created outside the limits of the British Empire, and Sarawak was technically an independent principality of the Rajah. The difficulty was sidestepped by founding the diocese upon the island of Labuan, a Crown Colony since 1846. The bishop of Labuan could then be appointed bishop of Sarawak by the Rajah. This practice prevailed until Sarawak became a Crown Colony in 1946.

Letters Patent were issued on 6 August 1855, erecting the "Island of Labuan and its Dependencies into a Bishop's See or Diocese to be styled the Bishopric of Labuan." McDougall was nominated by the Crown as the first bishop, and was consecrated on 18 October 1855 in Calcutta. On 1 January 1856 he was appointed bishop of Sarawak.

The linked diocese of Labuan and bishopric of Sarawak increased in size as the principality grew and Anglican work in North Borneo and Brunei developed. It extended further when, by an Act of Parliament in 1869, the Church in the Straits Settlements (Singapore, Penang and Malacca) was separated from the see of Calcutta and placed under the episcopal care of the bishop of Labuan. This arrangement lasted until 1909, when the diocese of Singapore was founded.

The first sixty years of the Church in Borneo were a chronicle of effort, disappointment and service by priests and lay missionaries. Asian workers played an increasingly larger part as time passed because the formation of a truly indigenous church had been intended from the beginning.

=== 20th century and today ===
After 1909, when the bishop could concentrate on Borneo alone, a new era in the Church began. Three decades of growth and development followed, with the longed-for ordination of Dayak and Chinese clergy in increasing numbers.

After the devastation of World War II the diocese of Labuan and the bishopric of Sarawak were joined into the diocese of Borneo and in 1949 Nigel Cornwall was consecrated bishop. His immediate task was to restore the ruins of the churches, schools and other mission property destroyed during the years of the Japanese occupation. 1953 saw the construction of the new St. Thomas' Cathedral to replace the leaky wooden edifice built by McDougall. Men prepared for ordination at the House of the Epiphany (established in 1952) provided nine new priests for the area in 1956.

By 1962 plans were completed for the division of the diocese of Borneo. The new diocese of Jesselton (Sabah) including Labuan came into being on 24 July 1962. The remainder of the diocese, including Brunei, was reconstituted as the Diocese of Kuching on 13 August 1962. Nigel Cornwall continued as Bishop.

The limits of the Diocese are those of the present administrative divisions of the State of Sarawak and Brunei Darussalam together with that part of Indonesian Borneo lying North of the equator, and West of longitude 115 º42’.

On 7 April 1970 the diocese of West Malaysia was formed to separate that region from Singapore.

The present Bishop is the Right Reverend Danald Jute, who is the 14th Lord Bishop of Kuching since 1855, when the diocese was first created.

=== List of Bishops ===
Bishop of Labuan and Sarawak
From	Until	Incumbent	Notes
1856	1869	Francis McDougall	
Bishops of Labuan, Sarawak and Singapore
From	Until	Incumbent	Notes
1869	1881	Walter Chambers	Churches in the Straits Settlements separated from the Diocese of Calcutta and placed under the Diocese of Labuan and Sarawak. Diocese renamed Diocese of Labuan, Sarawak and Singapore.
1882	1908	George Hose	
Bishops of Labuan and Sarawak
From	Until	Incumbent	Notes
1909	1916	Robert Mounsey	Churches in Singapore were separated from the Diocese to form its own Diocese of Singapore. The Diocese reverted to the name of Diocese of Labuan and Sarawak.
1917	1931	Logie Danson	Returned to England as Assistant Bishop of Carlisle; later Bishop of Edinburgh and Primus
1932	1937	Noel Hudson	
1938	1948	Francis Hollis	Returned to England as Assistant Bishop of Leicester
Bishop of Borneo
From	Until	Incumbent	Notes
1948	1962	Nigel Cornwall	The diocese was renamed the Diocese of Borneo and included Anglican missions in Kalimantan.
Bishops of Kuching
From	Until	Incumbent	Notes
1963	1968	Nicholas Allenby	The diocese was separated into the Diocese of Kuching and the Diocese of Jesselton (later renamed the Diocese of Sabah); David Howard Nicholas Allenby was consecrated bishop 30 November 1962 by Michael Ramsey, Archbishop of Canterbury, at Southwark Cathedral; later Assistant Bishop of Worcester
1968	1984	Basil Temenggong	The first native Malaysian and Sarawakian to be appointed as bishop. After Temenggong died suddenly, the former Assistant Bishop of Kuching, Peter Howes, returned to be the acting Bishop.
1985	1995	John Leong Chee Yun	
1996	2007	Made Katib	
2007	2017	Bolly Lapok	Archbishop of South East Asia, 2012–2016. Aeries Sumping Jingan and Solomon Cheong were Assistant Bishops.
2017	present	Danald Jute	Current incumbent since 2017. Andrew Shie is his Assistant.

== Archdeaconries ==
The diocese is divided into six distinct archdeaconries.

1. Archdeaconry of Negara Brunei Darussalam (Established 12 May 2024)

- Archdeacon: The Rt. Revd. Andrew Shie

2. Archdeaconry of North Sarawak (established 17/12/1969)

- Archdeacon: The Venerable Ramdan Mejem

3. Archdeaconry of Upper Central Sarawak (2023)

- Archdeacon: The Venerable Jose Jol Endru

4. Archdeaconry of Lower Central Sarawak (formed in 2007)

- Archdeacon: The Venerable Tony Jilat George

5. Archdeaconry of Upper South Sarawak (established 17/7/2022)

- Archdeacon: The Venerable Phillip Tauk

6. Archdeaconry of Lower South Sarawak

- Archdeacon: The Venerable Joseph Dusit Ejau

== Parishes ==
=== Parishes in Sarawak, Malaysia ===
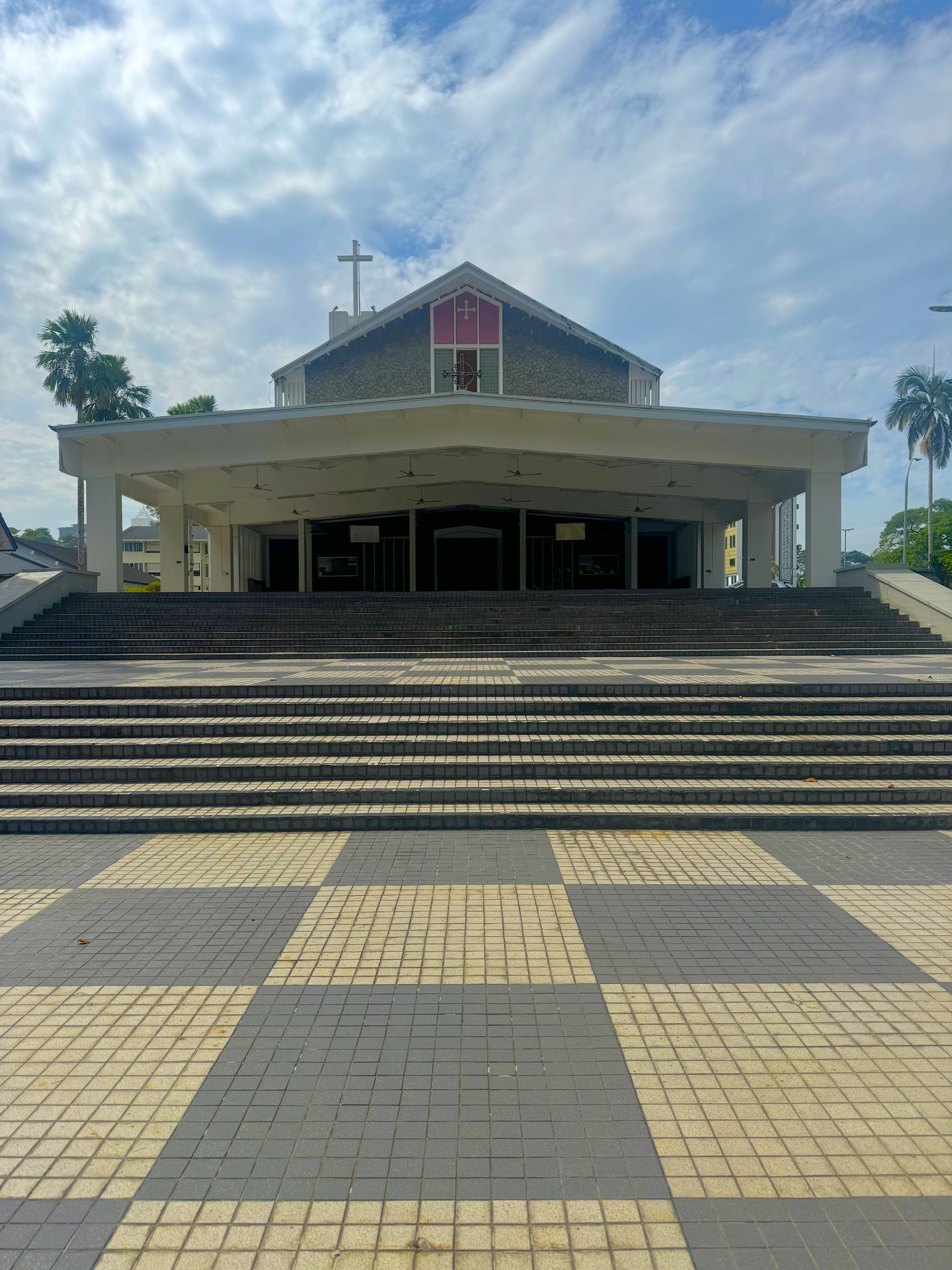
St. Thomas' Cathedral.

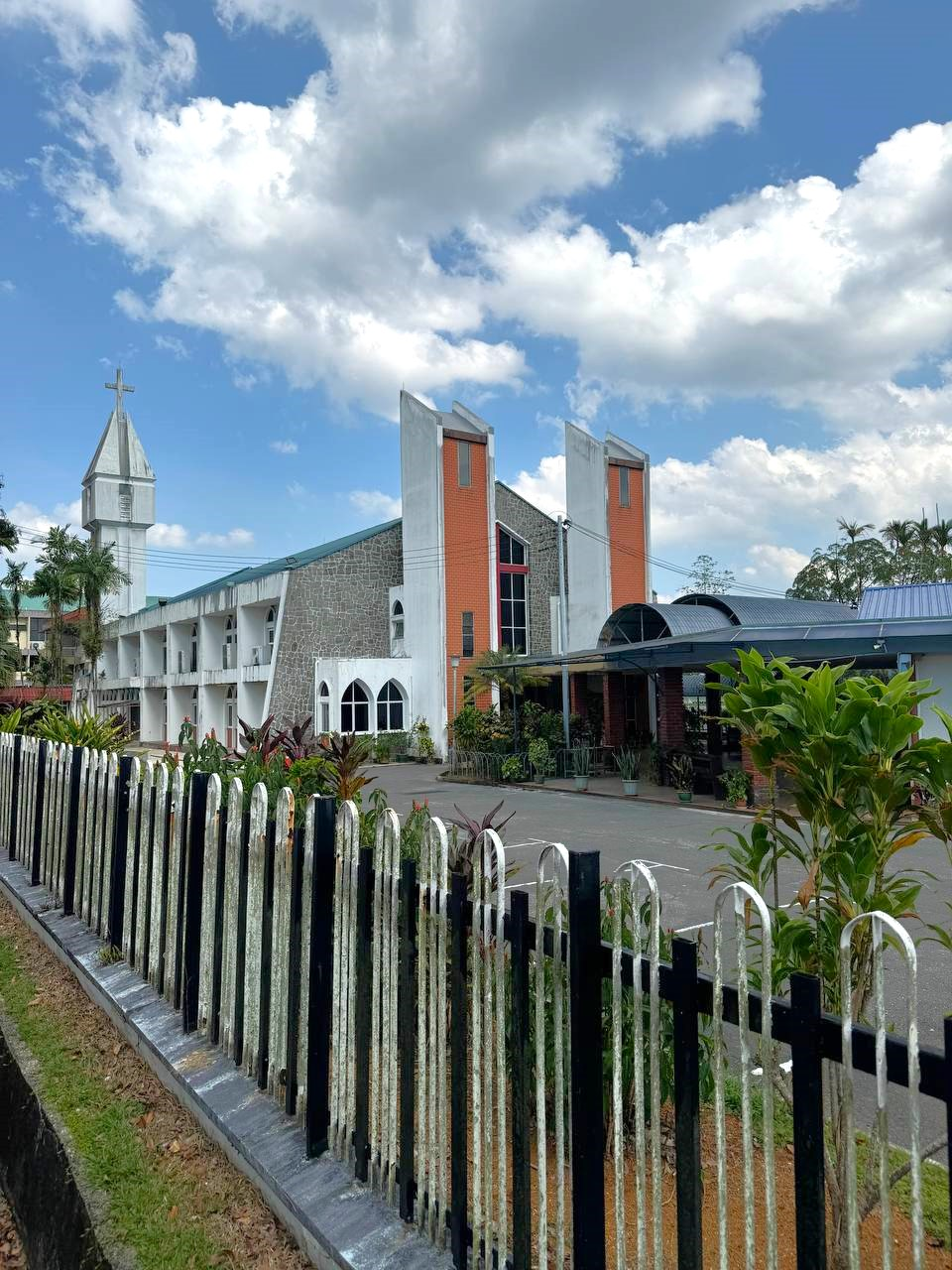
Saint Faith's Church in Kenyalang Park.

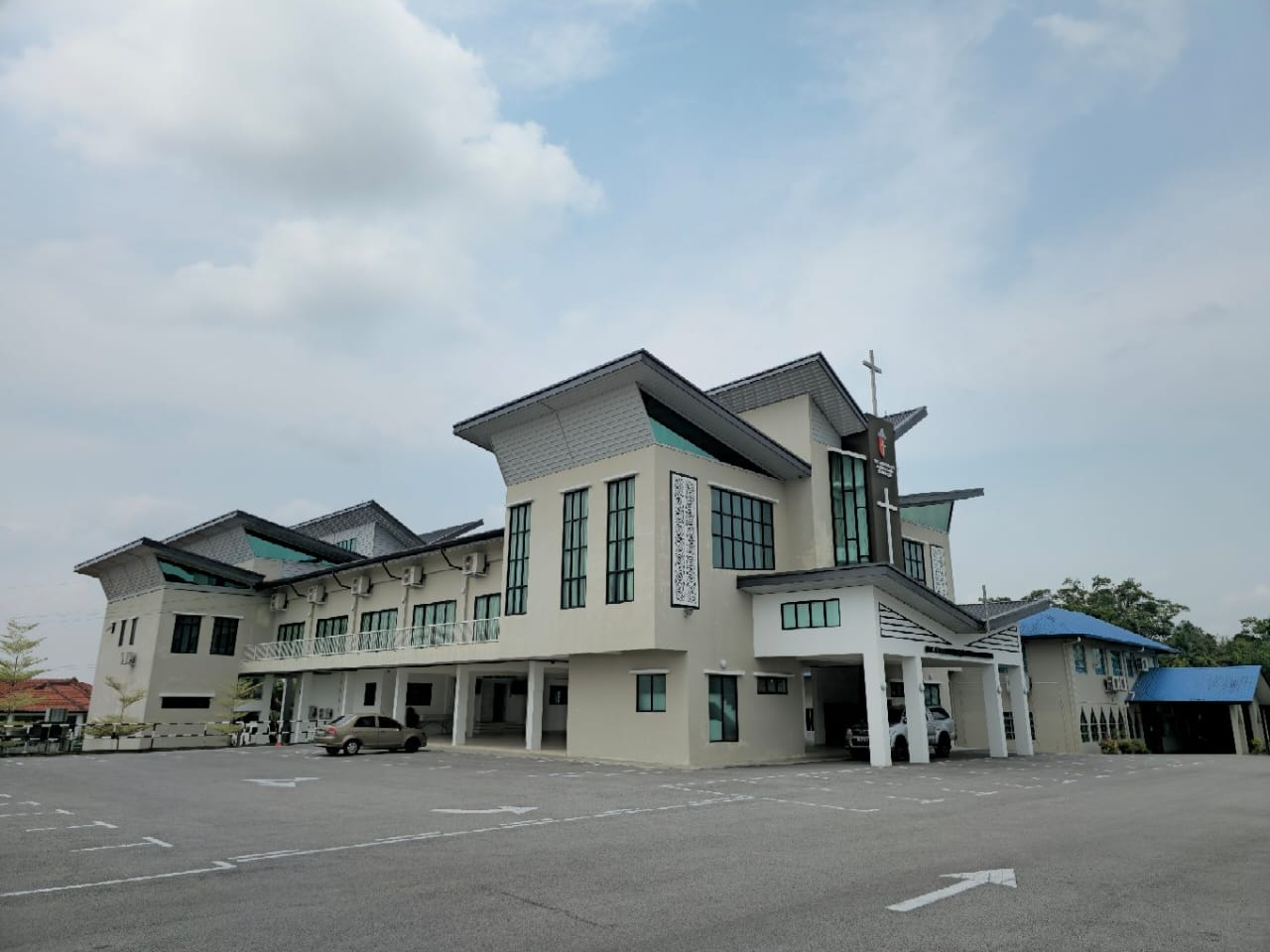
St. Francis's Church, Kota Samarahan

- St. Thomas's Cathedral, Kuching, McDougall Road, P.O. Box 347, 93704 Kuching, Sarawak, Malaysia.

Dean: Kho Thong Meng

- St. Mathew's Church, Mundai, 24th. Mile Kuching/Serian Road, 94200 Kuching, Sarawak, Malaysia.

Vicar: Widos Pauh

- St. Faith's Church, Kuching, Chawan Road, Kenyalang Park, P.O. Box 976, 93720 Kuching, Sarawak, Malaysia.

Vicar: Bradley Sangan

- St. James's Church, Kuap, P.O. Box 347, 93704 Kuching, Sarawak, Malaysia.

Vicar: Kebin Su-ur

- St. Francis's Church, Kota Samarahan, Jalan Datuk Mohd. Musa, 94300 Kota Samarahan, Sarawak, Malaysia.

Vicar: Kelvin Jawa

- St. Philip's Church, Padawan, P.O. Box 347, 93704 Kuching, Sarawak, Malaysia.

Vicar: Pilot Mejem

- St. Paul's Church, Bunuk, P.O. Box 347, 93704 Kuching, Sarawak, Malaysia.

Vicar: Johnny Lebar

- St. John's Church, Taee, P.O. Box 347, 93704 Kuching, Sarawak, Malaysia.

Vicar: Philip Tauk

- St. Maria's Church, Abok, P.O. Box 347, 93704 Kuching, Sarawak, Malaysia.

Vicar: Villy Velin

- St. Luke's Church, Sri Aman, Sabu Road, P.O. Box 220, 95008 Sri Aman, Sarawak, Malaysia.

Vicar: Tony Jilat George

- St. Francis's Church, Lundu, Jalan Sekambal, 94500 Lundu, Sarawak, Malaysia.

Vicar: Peter Augustine

- St. Stephen's Church, Simunjan, Jalan Sabun, Peti Surat 3, 94800 Simunjan, Sarawak, Malaysia.

Vicar: Jeffery Munap

- St. Michael's Church, Engkilili, Jalan Belon ak. Upak, 95800 Engkilili, Sarawak, Malaysia.

Vicar: Moses Jakir

- St. Philip's Church, Lubok Antu, 95900 Sri Aman, Sarawak, Malaysia

Vicar: Afron Gori

- St. Augustine's Church, Betong, Jalan Datuk Basil Temenggong, 95700 Betong, Sarawak, Malaysia.

Vicar: Rentap Nuang

- St. Helen's Church, Serian, P.O. Box 81, 94700, Serian, Sarawak, Malaysia.

Vicar: Stanley Kiew

- St. Christopher's Church, Debak, 95500 Debak, Sarawak, Malaysia.

Vicar: Eric Riis

- St. Peter's Church, Saratok, P.O. Box 24, 95400 Saratok, Sarawak, Malaysia.

Vicar: Rodriguez Unak Charles

- St. John's Church, Sibu, Jalan Tun Abg. Hj. Openg, P.O. Box 1315, 96008 Sibu, Sarawak, Malaysia.

Vicar: Jose Jol Endru

- St. Thomas' Church, Bintulu, P.O. Box 120, 97007 Bintulu, Sarawak, Malaysia.

Vicar: Josh Sim Kuan Hui

- St. Boniface's Church, Mamut, c/o St. Giles' Chapel, P.O. Box 57, 98200 Batu Niah, Miri, Sarawak, Malaysia.

Vicar: Timon Lugi

- St. Columba's Church, Miri, P.O. Box 233, 98007 Miri, Sarawak, Malaysia.

Vicar: Roland Rayang

- The Church of Good Shepherd, Lutong, P.O. Box 423, 98107 Lutong, Miri, Sarawak, Malaysia.

Vicar: Pilu Gumba

- St. Mark's Church, Limbang, P.O. Box 107, 98707 Limbang, Sarawak, Malaysia.

Acting Priest-in-charge: Kumar Keristay

- Tabuan Jaya Anglican Church, No.262, Lorong Song 1, Tabuan Heights, 93350 Kuching, Sarawak, Malaysia.

Vicar: Richard Chang

- All Saints' Church, Tabuan, P.O.Box 347,93704 Kuching, Sarawak, Malaysia

Vicar: Kamor Dian

- St. Paul's Church, Siol Kandis, P.O.Box 347, 93704 Kuching, Sarawak, Malaysia

Vicar: Stephen Ngabong

- St. Matthew's Church, Batu Kawa, Sungai Maong, Survey Lot 3573, Lot 2520, Fl.1, SL 5, Jalan Sungai Maong Utama, 93200 Kuching, Sarawak.

Vicar: Louis Then Jit Seng

- St. Simon's Church, Malihah, Synergy Square, Matang Jaya, Jln.Matang, 93050 Kuching, Sarawak.

Vicar: Nelson Kent

- St.Margaret's Church, Stampin, Kampung Stampin, Off Taman BDC, Jalan Stutong, 93350, Kuching, Sarawak, Malaysia.

Vicar: Almond Pritchie

- Christ Church, Stunggang, Kampung Stunggang Dayak 94500 Lundu, Sarawak, Malaysia.

Vicar: Andy Kiew

- All Saints' Anglican Church, Bengoh Resettlement Scheme (BRS)

Vicar: Evriston Kisau

- St. Mary's Church, Kandis Lama, Bau, c/o P.O.Box 347, 93704, Kuching, Sarawak, Malaysia.

Vicar: Holsen Osin

- St. Lawrence's Church, Sabu, Sri Aman, Sarawak, Malaysia.

Vicar: Jecksion Tay

- St. Stephen's Church, Pantu, P.O.Box 347, 93704 Kuching, Sarawak, Malaysia.

Vicar: Elebis Tan Entry

- St. Benedict's Church, Skrang, 95800, Engkilili, Skrang, Betong Division, Sarawak, Malaysia.

Vicar: Eliot Ijau

- St. Paul's Church, Roban, 95300, Bahagian Betong, Sarawak, Malaysia.

Vicar: Philip Mang

- St. Alban's Church, Sarikei, Jalan Susur Jambu Selatan, Susur Jambu, 96100 Sarikei, Sarawak, Malaysia.

Vicar: Andrew Smatik Brun

- St. James's Church, Bintangor, Jalan Kelupu, 96500 Maradong, Sarawak

Vicar: Jaol Galang

- St. Giles's Church, Batu Niah, P.O.Box 57, 98200 Batu Niah, Miri, Sarawak.

Vicar: Christopher Ajis

- St. Barnabas's Church, Miri, Lot 4885, Jalan Rejang 4, Jalan Sibu, 98000, Taman Tunku, Miri, Sarawak, Malaysia.

Vicar: Ramdan Mejem

- Holy Trinity Church, Lambir, Lot 94, Jalan Meranti, Kpg Tunku Abdul Rahman Lambir P.O.Box 617, 98000, Miri, Sarawak.

Vicar: Johny Janggok

- St. Matthias's Church, Tudan, Lot 1455, Lorong Perdana 5C, Desaras, Tudan Phase 6, P.O.Box 47, 98107 Lutong, Miri, Sarawak

Vicar: Kanyan Randi

- St. Nicholas's Church, Bandar Baru Samariang No.1960, Lorong Cahaya Damai 4, Bandar Baru Samariang, Petra Jaya, 93050, Kuching

Vicar: Jugah Adi

- St. Augustine's Church, Mambong, Siburan, Sarawak

Vicar: Jeffry Renos Nawie

=== Parishes in Brunei Darussalam ===
- St. James's Church, Kuala Belait, P.O. Box 79, Kuala Belait KA1131, Negara Brunei Darussalam

Vicar:

- St. Margaret's Church, Seria, P.O. Box 788, Seria KB1133, Negara Brunei Darussalam

Vicar:

- St. Andrew's Church, BSB, P.O. Box 126, Bandar Seri Begawan BS8670, Negara Brunei Darussalam

Vicar:

=== Mission districts ===
- St. Mary's Church, Matang c/o P.O.Box 347, 93704 Kuching

Vicar: Robin Sabai

- St. Paul's Church, Banting c/o P.O.Box 347, 93704 Kuching

Vicar: Camcay Ngam

- St. Simon's Chapel, Sebuyau c/o P.O.Box 347, 93704, Kuching

Vicar: (South Korea) David Tak

- The House of the Epiphany, Jln. McDougall, 93000 Kuching

Warden in-charge: Alfred Damu Bulang

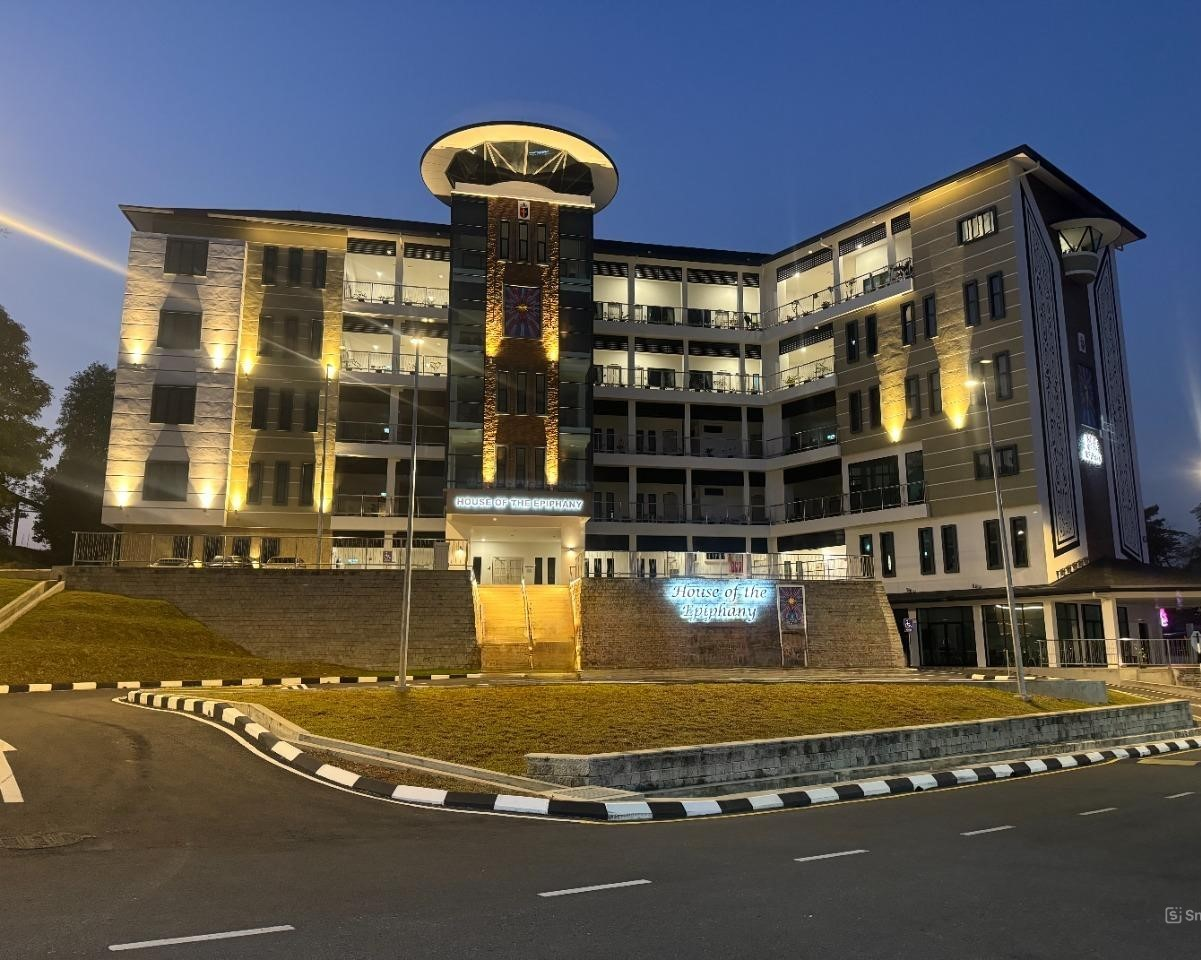
House of the Epiphany.

- The Kidurong Anglican Centre, Lot 3028, Jalan Abang Matassan, Tg, Kidurong, 97000 Bintulu, Sarawak

Warden (s): Frederick Romzy

- Kapit Anglican Mission Centre, Lot 921, Jalan Airport, 96800 Kapit, Sarawak

Resident Priest: Makos Mark Luna

- Mukah Anglican Centre, 2nd Floor, Sublot 4, Block 68, R. C. Building, Mukah Land District, 96400 Mukah, Sarawak

Resident Priest: Anthony Sedah Eyok

- St. John's Extension Centre Anglican Church, Sibu Jaya, 1st Floor, No. 25, Lot 1192, Sibu Jaya, 96000 Sibu, Sarawak

Vicar: Jose Jol Endru

- All Saints' Mission District, Kg. Gua, 95000 Sri Aman, Sarawak

Vicar: TBA

== Schools ==
=== Primary ===
- SK St. Thomas, Kuching
  - Headmaster:
- SK St. Mary, Kuching
  - Headmaster:
- SK Garland, Batu Kawa, Kuching
  - Headmaster:
- SK Holy Name, Rukam, Lundu
  - Headmaster:
- SK St. John, Sebayor, Kota Samarahan
  - Headmaster:
- SK St. Michael, Entingan, Kota Samarahan
  - Headmaster:
- SK St. Alban, Sg. Tapang, Kota Padawan
  - Headmaster:
- SK St. Philip, Kota Padawan
  - Headmaster:
- SK St. Augustine, Mambong, Kota Padawan
  - Headmaster:
- SK St. George, Punau, Kota Padawan
  - Headmaster:
- SK St. Matthew, Mundai, Kota Padawan
  - Headmaster:
- SK St. James, Kuap, Kota Padawan
  - Headmaster:
- SK St. Alban, Duras, Kota Padawan
  - Headmaster:
- SK St. Patrick, Semadang, Kota Padawan
  - Headmaster:
- SK St. Paul, Bunuk, Kota Padawan
  - Headmaster:
- SK St. Gregory, Giam, Kota Padawan
  - Headmaster:
- SK St. David, Bumbok, Kota Padawan
  - Headmaster:
- SK St. Bernard, Sadir, Kota Padawan
  - Headmaster:
- SK St. Giles, Git, Kota Padawan
  - Headmaster:
- SK St. Barnabas, Baru, Serian
  - Headmaster:
- SK St. John, Taee, Serian
  - Headmaster:
- SK St. Matthew, Lanchang, Serian
  - Headmaster:
- SK St. Ambrose, Panchor, Serian
  - Headmaster:
- SK All Saints, Plaman Nyabet, Serian
  - Headmaster:
- SK St. James, Rayang, Serian
  - Headmaster:
- SK St. Dunstan, Maang, Serian
  - Headmaster:
- SK St. Edward, Belimbing, Serian
  - Headmaster:
- SK St. Swithun, Payang, Serian
  - Headmaster:
- SK St. Luke, Sri Aman
  - Headmaster:
- SK St. Lawrence, Sabu, Sri Aman
  - Headmaster:
- SK St. Martin, Lachau, Sri Aman
  - Headmaster:
- SK St. Paul, Banting, Sri Aman
  - Headmaster:
- SK St. Dunstan, Seduku, Sri Aman
  - Headmaster:
- SK St. Leo, Gayau, Sri Aman
  - Headmaster:
- SK St. Augustine, Betong
  - Headmaster:
- SK St. Peter and St. Paul, Nanga Buli, Padeh, Betong
  - Headmaster:
- SK St. Bartholomew, Geraji, Betong
  - Headmaster:
- SK St. Barnabas, Blassau, Debak, Betong
  - Headmaster:
- SK St. Christopher, Debak, Betong
  - Headmaster:
- SK St. John, Nanga Tiga, Layar, Betong
  - Headmaster:
- SK St. Mark, Batu Genting, Layar, Betong
  - Headmaster:
- SK St. Peter, Saratok
  - Headmaster:
- SK St. Paul, Roban, Saratok
  - Headmaster:
- SK St. Michael, Plassu, Roban, Saratok
  - Headmaster:
- SK St. Columba, Miri
  - Headmaster:

=== Secondary ===
- SMK St. Thomas, Kuching
  - Principal:
- SMK St. Mary, Kuching
  - Principal:
- SMK St. Luke, Sri Aman
  - Principal:
- SMK St. Augustine, Betong
  - Principal:
- SMK St. Columba, Miri
  - Principal:

== See also ==
- Anglicanism
- Borneo Mission Association
- Province of the Anglican Church in South East Asia
- Council of Churches Malaysia
- Persatuan Gereja-gereja Sarawak
- Bishop of Kuching
- House of the Epiphany
