= Peter Howes =

Anglican bishop in Malaysia

Peter Henry Herbert Howes OBE PBS (20 March 1911 – 12 April 2003) was an English clergyman in the Anglican Church who spent 44 years in Borneo. He was an assistant bishop of Kuching from 1976 to 1981.

== Early life ==
Howes was born as Henry Herbert Howes in 1911 in Suffolk to Herbert William Howes (1879-1982), a farmer, and his wife Lilian Emma (née Tungate) (1886-1973). Herbert Howes subsequently became Director of the National Institute of Poultry Husbandry (now part of Harper Adams University) and young Henry (later Peter) grew up in Shropshire, and attended Adams Grammar School in Newport.

== Career ==
He went to Kelham Theological College in 1929 to train for ordination with the Society of the Sacred Mission. He was ordained deacon in 1934 and priest in 1935. He served his title at St Michael and All Angels, Norton, Co Durham (1934–37).

Howes went to Sarawak as a SPG missionary in 1937. At first Missioner of St Augustine's Mission, Betong (1937–38), he was then Headmaster of St. Michael's Secondary School, Sandakan (1938–40). He was then Priest-in-Charge of Quop (1940–50), but that ten year incumbency masks his experiences of the Second World War. He was interned by the Japanese at the Batu Lintang camp from Christmas Eve 1941 to 1945. Despite the privations of that experience, he was able to translate the New Testament from Greek into Land Dayak, writing on the back of labels from bottles and hiding the texts under the floorboards of his hut. In 1963 the British and Foreign Bible Society printed Howes' New Testament in Dayak.

He was Priest-in-Charge of Tai-I (1950–52) and then the first Warden of the House of the Epiphany Theological School, Kuching (1952–56). His next appointment was a non-clerical one. From 1957 to 1960 he was Officer-in-Charge and responsible for the implementation of the Padawan Improvement Scheme, which brought improvements in education, hygiene and agriculture to villages near the Indonesian border.

He was a Canon of Borneo Cathedral (1955–62) and then the re-established St Thomas's Cathedral in Kuching (1962–71), as well as Canon Missioner (1961–71). At the same time he was Archdeacon of Sarawak (1961–62), Kuching (1962–65), and Brunei and North Sarawak (1965–71). He was Principal of the re-founded House of the Epiphany (1971–76) (there was a separate Warden) and then finally Assistant Bishop of Kuching (1976–81).

During the colonial period, Howes was a member of the Sarawak State Council. He was awarded an OBE in 1961. He appointed a Companion of the Order of the Star of Sarawak (PBS) when the Order was revived in 1964. He retired in 1981, but when the first indigenous Bishop of Kuching, Basil Temenggong, died suddenly in 1984, Howes returned to Kuching to be acting bishop.

== Personal life ==
In retirement, Howes lived in York. He died in 2003, aged 92.

== Works ==
- Shun nyamba nang: A collection of Land Dayak stories, (1952: Macmillan).
- "The Lintang Camp: Reminiscences of an Internee during the Japanese Occupation, 1942–1945" Journal of the Malaysian Historical Society (Sarawak Branch) (1976) 2, 33–47.
- In a Fair Ground, or Cibus Cassowari, (1994: Excalibur). ISBN 1-85634-367-7
