= Bolly Lapok =

The Most Reverend Datuk Bolly anak Lapok PGBK DPMS
- Bishop of Kuching and Archbishop of the Province of Anglican Church in South East Asia
- Church: Anglican
- Archdiocese: Church of the Province of South East Asia
- Diocese: Kuching
- In office: 2012–2016
- Predecessor: John Chew
- Successor: Ng Moon Hing
- Previous post: Bishop of Kuching (2007–2017)

Orders
- Ordination: 2 March 1975
- Consecration: 14 May 2007
- Rank: Bishop of Kuching

Personal details
- Born: 10 August 1952 (age 73) Sebemban, Simanggang, Sarawak, British Empire

Bolly anak Lapok PGBK, DPMS (born 10 August 1952) was the fourth Metropolitan Archbishop and Primate of the Anglican Church of the Province of South East Asia as well as the Bishop of Kuching.

An ethnic Iban, Bolly was the first Primate of the Province from Sarawak.

== Early life and education ==
Bolly was born into an Iban family in Sebemban, a traditional longhouse village near Simanggang (present-day Sri Aman) in Sarawak. He had his early primary education in the Selanjan and Pantu primary schools, and completed his secondary education up to the Sixth form in the Simanggang Secondary School.

In 1972, Bolly began his theological training at the House of the Epiphany, the theological seminary of the Diocese of Kuching, graduating with a Diploma in Theology in 1974. He proceeded his studies to obtain a Licentiate in Theology as well as a Scholar in Theology in 1977. In 1983, he went to Westhill College (today part of the University of Birmingham), on a scholarship from the United Society for the Propagation of the Gospel (USPG), where he majored in Pastoral Theology, Ecumenism and English. In that period, he also went to Rome for studies in Anglican – Roman Catholic ecumenism. In 2001, he did his postgraduate studies in Missiology in the University of Birmingham on another USPG scholarship; he graduated in 2007 with a Master of Arts.

== Ministry ==
On 2 March 1975, Bolly was ordained a deacon. As he was below the canonical age for ordination, special dispensation had to be granted by the Archbishop of Canterbury, Donald Coggan. On 7 December the same year, he was ordained as the priest for the parish of St. Luke in Simanggang.

In 1978, he was called to the rural parish of St. Boniface in Mamut near Miri. He returned to the parish of St. John in Sibu in 1983, and St. Thomas in Bintulu in 1984. On 13 June 1991, he was called as Archdeacon of North Sarawak and Brunei, serving for several years. He was elected as Assistant Bishop of Kuching on 5 September 1999.

On 15 April 2007, Bolly was consecrated as the 13th Bishop of Kuching, succeeding the Rt. Rev'd Datuk Made Katib. In the Extraordinary Provincial Synod Meeting held in Kota Kinabalu, Sabah, Malaysia on 21 to 23 September 2011, he was elected as the Archbishop elect of the Province of South East Asia and was installed on 12 February 2012 at St. Thomas' Cathedral in Kuching, succeeding the Most Rev'd John Chew. He is the first person from Sarawak as well as the second Malaysian to serve in this position (the first one was the Bishop of Sabah, Datuk Yong Ping Chung).

Bolly has served as the Chairman of the Association of Churches in Sarawak since 2009.

== Personal life ==
Bolly married Lily Unchau in 1981, whom he first met while serving as the parish priest in Mamut. He was widowed when Lily Unchau died from illness on 27 May 2006.

On 18 August 2007, Bolly married Mary Jean Baba in a ceremony held at the Bishop's Chapel. Bolly has a total of four children from his two marriages (three children from his first marriage and one stepchild from the second marriage).

== See also ==
- Bishop of Kuching
- Church of the Province of South East Asia

Anglican Communion titles
Preceded by Datuk Made Katib	Bishop of Kuching; 2007–2017	Succeeded by Danald Jute
Preceded by John Chew	Archbishop of South East Asia; 2012–2016	Succeeded by Datuk Ng Moon Hing
