= John Leong =

Anglican bishop in Malaysia

- Born: May 23, 1925; Kuching, Malaysia
- Died: October 18, 2013 (aged 88)
- Education: St. Joseph's Secondary School, Miri; St. Thomas' Secondary School, Kuching; St. Joseph's Secondary School, Kuching
- Ordained: 1975
- Offices held: Bishop of Kuching

The Rt Rev Dato' Sri John Leong Chee Yun PNBS (known in English as John Leong) (23 May 1925 – 18 October 2013) was a Malaysian clergyman in the Anglican Church. He was the third Bishop of Kuching from 1985 until his retirement in 1995.

== Early life ==
Leong was born in 1925 in Kuching, the son of a tailor. His father died when young John was eight and the family moved to Miri, where he was educated at St. Joseph's Secondary School in the said town and later returned to Kuching and resumed his studies in the school of the same name as well as in St. Thomas' Secondary School, Kuching. During the Japanese occupation from 1943 to 1945, Leong learnt Japanese and was employed as a passport officer and interpreter. He had a long career as an accountant with Shell.

== Clerical career ==
Leong was appointed a lay reader in 1951. He was ordained deacon in 1975 and priest later the same year, then serving as a non-stipendiary priest at St Columba's Church, Miri, becoming its Vicar in 1983. Following the death of Basil Temenggong, Leong was appointed Bishop of Kuching in 1985. He retired as Bishop in 1995, upon turning 70 and was replaced by Made Katib.

He was a candidate for election for the Sarawak National Party (SNAP) for the electorate of Miri in the 1969 Sarawak state election, coming second to Chia Chin Shin.

He was awarded the Bentara Bintang Sarawak in 1969, the Ahli Bintang Sarawak in 1981 and later the Panglima Negara Bintang Sarawak in 1987, all of which are honours in the Most Exalted Order of the Star of Sarawak.

== Personal life ==
From 1953 to 1961, he was the British Borneo table tennis champion representing the Crown Colony of Sarawak. Leong died in 2013, aged 88. His funeral was held at St Thomas's Cathedral, Kuching.
