= House of the Epiphany =

Anglican theological college in Malaysia

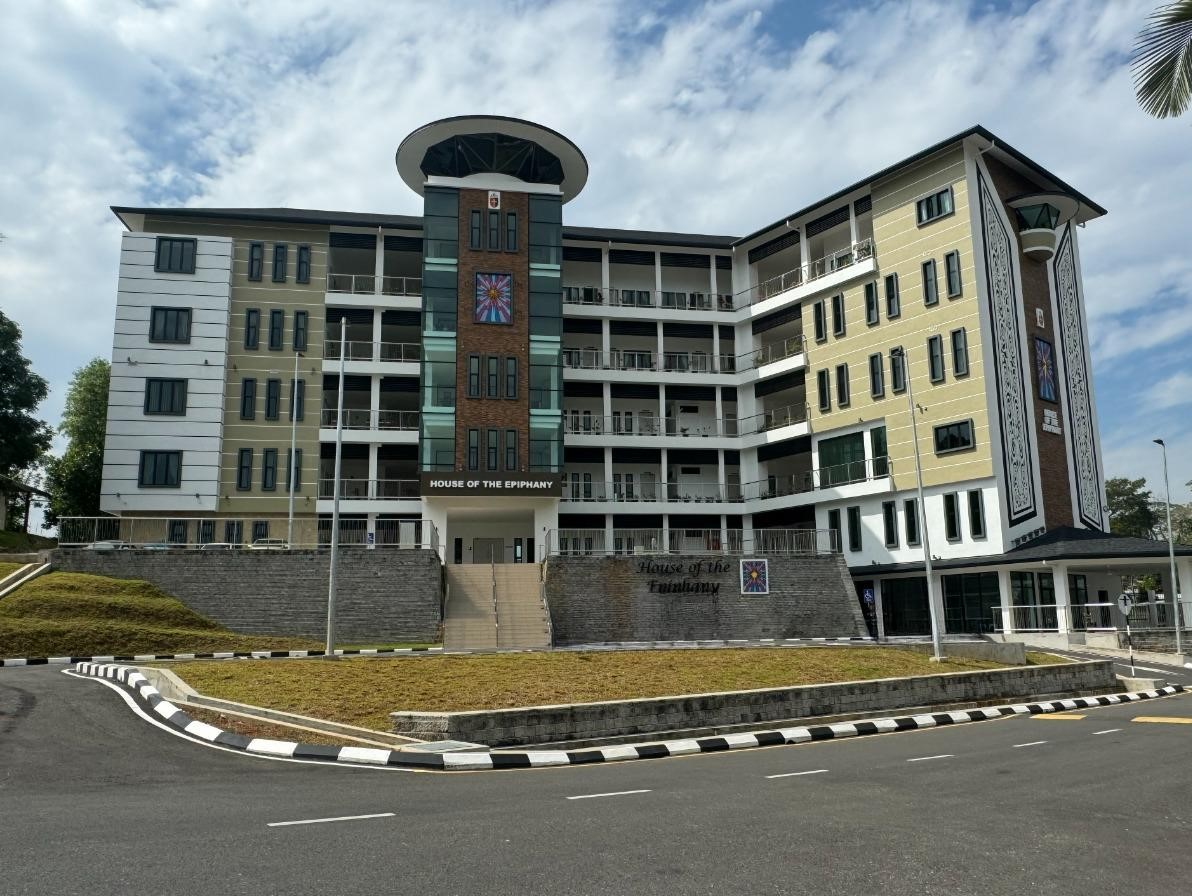
House of the Epiphany.

The House of the Epiphany is an Anglican educational institution in Kuching, Malaysia, providing theological education to candidates for ordination. It was established in 1952. There were a number of short-lived theological colleges in what is now the Diocese of Kuching before the House of the Epiphany was opened.

== College of the Holy Way ==
The first theological college in the then Diocese of Labuan was established in 1921, as the College of the Holy Way (also known as Divinity College) in Kudat. The Warden from 1921 to 1928 was the Rev Ernest Parry. Five Chinese candidates were prepared for ordination (as deacons in 1927 and priests in 1928), including the Rev Lim Siong Teck (subsequently martyred by the Japanese in 1945), the Rev Vun Nen Vun, the Rev Chong Paul En Siong, the Rev Lai Choon Sang, and the Rev Chin Phu Yin. The college closed in 1930.

== School of the Holy Spirit ==
The second theological school in the Diocese of Labuan was established by the Rev Wilfrid Linton in 1925. Linton opened the School of the Holy Spirit in Betong, for Indigenous candidates. Matius Senang and Thomas Buda were ordained priests in 1926 and Laurence Angking in 1932. Linton's health broke down, and the school then closed.

== Ordination Test School ==
Five members of the Community of the Resurrection in Mirfield arrived in Kuching in 1933: Frs Edward Oswald Philipps, Wilfred Percy Brightwen Shelley, Thomas, Andrew Hamish Blair (later Principal of the College of the Resurrection) and Richard Law Wrathall. The following year the Ordination Test School was opened in Kuching with six candidates, of whom Hope Hugh, Lim Yong Chua, Martin Nanang and Ng Thau Sin proceeded to ordination as deacons in 1936 and priests in 1937. In 1937 the last member of the CR left and the school closed.

== House of the Epiphany ==
The Rev (later Rt Rev) Peter Howes was recalled to Kuching from Taee in 1952 and tasked with opening a theological college for local candidates by the newly appointed bishop, Nigel Cornwall. Ten students joined and initially the college met in the Bishop's house. The college building was completed and dedicated on the Feast of the Epiphany in 1953, and was thus named the House of the Epiphany. Six students proceeded to ordination as deacons in 1955 and priests in 1956: Edmund Paleng, James Gunyau, Peter Radin, Arnold Puntang, Ambrose Dunggat and Alfred Chabu (later Archdeacon of Brunei and North Sarawak). The college then closed temporarily until 1971.

The House of the Epiphany reopened in 1971 (with Howes as Principal and the Rev Alex Reid as Warden). It reformed itself in 1987, affiliating with the Australian College of Theology, and offering the Diploma in Ministry. It re-established its independence in 1992 with the creation of the Bishop's Certificate of Ministry.

The ground breaking ceremony occurred in 2019 and the new building opened in 2022.

== Wardens ==
- The Rev (later Rt Rev) Peter Howes, 1952–56.
- The Rev William Alexander (Alex) Reid, 1971–76.
- The Rev Robert Anthony (Tony) Perry, 1976–79.
- The Rev Canon John Francis Edge, 1979–87.
- The Rev Fred Cooke, 1987–90.
- The Rev David Arthur Edwards, 1990-1992
- The Rev (later Rt Rev) Aeries Sumping Jingan, 1992-?
- The Rev (later Most Rev) Bolly Lapok, 1999-?
- The Rev Michael Spencer Woods, 2009-2017
- The Rev Canon Alfred Damu, c 2020
