= St. Thomas' National Secondary School =

- Sekolah Menengah Kebangsaan St. Thomas
- St. Thomas' Secondary School, Kuching logo

Location
- Jalan McDougall, Kuching, Sarawak, 93000; Malaysia

Information
- Type: Government-aided all-boys Secondary School
- Motto: Aim Higher
- Religious affiliation: Christian
- Denomination: Anglican Communion
- Founded: 1848
- Founder: Francis Thomas McDougall
- Oversight: Diocese of Kuching
- Session: Double
- President: The Most Reverend Datuk Danald Jute
- Chairman: Edgar Ong Liang Yong
- Principal: Silvester Roy anak Daud
- Education system: Public secondary Co-Ed
- Language: English
- Campus type: Urban
- Houses: Chambers, McDougall, Hose, Mounsey, Logie, Noel
- Colours: Black; Yellow; Red
- Song: Aim Higher
- Accreditation: Malaysia MOE
- Newspaper: The Square
- Yearbook: The Thomian
- Affiliation: St. Thomas' Cathedral, Kuching
- Website: SMK St. Thomas Facebook page

St. Thomas' Secondary School (Malay: Sekolah Menengah Kebangsaan St. Thomas) is an all-boys secondary day school (girls admitted in Form 6) situated in Kuching, the capital of the Malaysian state of Sarawak. It is the oldest school in Sarawak, though the school was originally at St Mary's location back in 1848. The school is the fourth oldest in Malaysia. The students of St. Thomas are called Thomians regardless of gender, and it is a government-aided mission school.

== History ==
=== The early years (1848-1941) ===
- A group of Anglican missionaries led by a priest-doctor, Francis Thomas McDougall arrived in Sarawak on 29 June 1848.
- On 5 August, Francis Thomas McDougall opened a day school for boys in an empty house in town. The home school was set up when James Brooke asked the mission to adopt four Eurasian children.
- In September 1848, the Rajah granted land situated east of the town to the mission. The home school moved there in 1849. It then became two separate Anglican schools in Kuching, St. Thomas' for boys and St. Mary's for girls.
- The Main Building was opened by the Rajah James Brooke on 13 August 1886.
- The new Assembly Hall was opened and blessed on 30 November 1927.
- Building of four Boarding Houses was declared open by Mr. Justice Boyd, the Judicial Commissioner on 10 September 1929.
- Francis Hollis, later Bishop of Labuan, Brunei and Sarawak, served as the principal of the school from 1928 to 1938.
- The Cambridge Junior Certificate examination was first taken in 1930, while in 1935, School Certificate examination was started.

=== World War II era (1941-1946) ===
- On the last day of the school term, 19 December 1941, Kuching was bombed by the Japanese Air Force. The Japanese Army landed in Kuching five days later on Christmas Eve and occupied the school compound on Christmas Day.
- During 1941, three to four hundred forced labourers were housed in the school. A swimming pool was built but was never completed.
- Several days before the Australians landed on 11 September 1945 the majority of the Japanese troops left Kuching and the school buildings were left empty. The school buildings including the Principal's House and offices were dismantled by labourers for firewood and for making wash bowls and furniture for sale.

=== The postwar years (1946-1962) ===
- Within three weeks after the Japanese surrender, St. Thomas' School and St. Mary's School reopened as a co-ed school but by 9 January 1946 the two schools separated once again.
- On 1 May 1947, the restored Main Building was formally opened by the Governor of the Crown Colony of Sarawak, Sir Charles Arden Clarke.
- The first post-war Cambridge Junior Certificate Examination was held in St. Mary's School Hall in 1947 and 21 candidates were successful.
- The first edition of the annual school magazine "The Thomian" was produced in 1949.
- The Old Thomian Association was formed in 1951 and Mr. E. W. Howell was elected its first alumni association president.
- In early 1952, the school was separated into Primary and Secondary Departments.
- St. Thomas' feast day was celebrated for the first time on 6 October 1954.
- The first edition of the school newspaper entitled "The Square" was inaugurally published and printed in May 1955.

=== Independence era (1963-1998) ===
- On 20 September 1969, the 2nd Governor of Sarawak, Tun Tuanku Haji Bujang officially opened the Datuk Amar James Wong Kim Min Hall.
- In 1971, then-Federal Education Minister, Dato' (now Tun) Hussein Onn paid a visit to the school in his capacity as minister of the said portfolio.
- The school's main building and the library was badly damaged by a fire which broke out on the night of 5 October 1979, while celebrations were going on in Kuching town center in conjunction with the Rulers' Conference meeting which was hosted by Sarawak.
- From 1982 onwards, Bahasa Malaysia became the medium of instruction owing to newly-implemented education reforms, as most mission schools in the country were transferred indirect ownership from Christian missionaries to the government for the sake of national unity in exchange of fundings or grants allocated in order to sustain the school's existence for the coming generations of teachers and students.
- The new Science Block was officially opened in 1990.
- The school celebrated its 150th anniversary in 1998. In the same year, the school's new canteen was completed.

=== 1998 onwards ===
2003

- The school celebrated its 155th founding anniversary and the 50th golden jubilee anniversary of sixth form education in Sarawak.

2006

- Opening of the school's newly-built mini stadium cum athletics track which was blessed by the then-Bishop of Kuching, Datuk Made Katib.

2008

- Celebrated its 160th founding anniversary in July.
- Featured in commemorative stamps and first day cover on 'Premier Schools of Malaysia' together with 3 other schools in the country on 16 December 2008 alongside Victoria Institution, All Saints Secondary School and Convent Bukit Nanas.

2023

- The school celebrated its 175th anniversary.

== Gallery ==
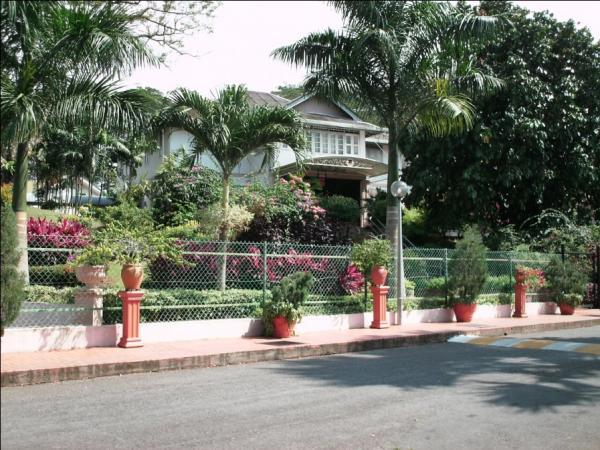
Principal's House

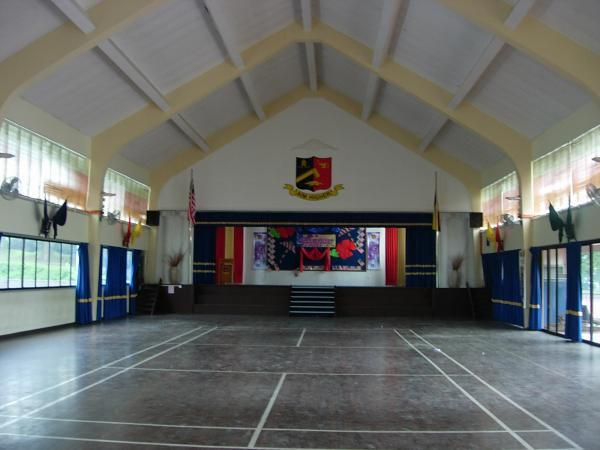
School Hall
