= Grosvenor Miles =

Anglican bishop in Madagascar and Australia

Grosvenor Miles (1901 – 15 July 1978) was an Anglican bishop in Madagascar and Australia. He was the assistant bishop of Madagascar from 1938 to 1960 and the assistant bishop of North Queensland from 1962 to his death in 1978.

== Early life ==
Miles was born in Natal, South Africa, in 1902, to New Zealander parents, William Lancelot Miles, and Gertrude Hilda Miles (née Miles). His parents were first cousins, and his father was the grandson of Henry Philips, one of the Canterbury Pilgrims. His exact date of birth is unknown, but he was 4 months old when he arrived with his family in England in March 1902. Miles was a mercantile assistant in Port Said, Egypt, in the 1920s, and, prior to ordination, a missionary in Mauritius.

== Clerical career ==
He trained for ordination at St Boniface College, Warminster, and was ordained deacon in 1932 and priest in 1933. He served his title at St Mary, Fishponds (1932–1934), after which he went to Madagascar as a missionary. He served at Andevorante in the Diocese of Atsinanana (1935–1936) and at Mahanoro (1936–1938), and was consecrated bishop in 1938 at St Mary-at-Lambeth along with Francis Hollis, the Bishop of Labuan and Sarawak; 7 June 1938, by Cosmo Lang, Archbishop of Canterbury. He was assistant bishop of Madagascar and Archdeacon of East Madagascar from 1938 to 1960. As assistant bishop, he established himself in Tamatave, with the intention that this would be a diocesan see on division of the Diocese of Madagascar, although this did not take place until three decades later, in 1969. In 1940 Gerald Vernon became Bishop of Madagascar, but, due to the Second World War and the Fall of France, was unable to get to his diocese, which, in his absence, was managed by Miles and the native clergy. He attended the 1958 Lambeth Conference.

In 1960 he moved to Australia, becoming a member of and chaplain to the Bush Brotherhood of St Barnabas in the Diocese of North Queensland, and, additionally, from 1962 he was assistant bishop of North Queensland, as assistant to Ian Shevill. As a Bush Brother he was the lowest-paid prelate in Australia, receiving a weekly stipend of 19s 1¼d.

== Personal life ==
Miles was unmarried. He died in 1978, aged 76, at the Good Shepherd Hospice in Townsville. He was still assistant bishop of North Queensland at his death. His ashes are interred under the High Altar of St James' Cathedral, Townsville.
