= Geoffrey Leicester Gray =

British colonial administrator (1905–1940

Geoffrey Leicester Gray CMG OBE
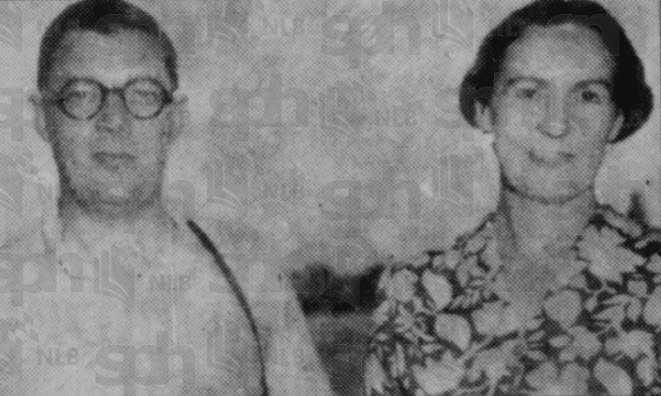
- Geoffrey Gray and his wife in 1953
- Born: 26 August 1905
- Died: 11 March 1994 (aged 89)
- Education: Latymer Upper School
- Occupation: Colonial administrator
- Years active: 1925–1961

Geoffrey Leicester Gray CMG OBE (26 August 1905 – 11 March 1994) was a British colonial administrator.

== Early life and education ==
Gray was born on 26 August 1905, the only son of Leonard Gray who was Resident Magistrate of Kingston, Jamaica. He was educated at Latymer Upper School, London.

== Career ==
Gray joined the North Borneo Civil Service in 1925 as a cadet, and served in various administrative posts. After qualifying in Malay and Law, he went to Canton in 1931 to study Chinese, and was attached to the Secretariat for Chinese Affairs in Hong Kong. The following year, he returned to North Borneo where he was appointed District Officer of Jesselton, and from 1932 to 1935, he was editor of the British North Borneo Herald and Official Gazette and superintendent of the Government Printing Office. In 1935, he served as District Officer of Kudat before he was appointed Government Under Secretary serving from 1935 to 1938, and was then promoted to Government Secretary remaining in the post until 1941 while also serving as ex-officio member of the Legislative Council and High Court judge. From 1941 to 1945, he was interned by the Japanese army as a POW.

In 1946, Gray was attached to the headquarters of the British Military Administration at Labuan. On the cession of North Borneo, when it became a British Crown Colony in 1946, he was assimilated into the Colonial Administrative Service and served in various posts, in succession: acting Deputy Chief Secretary of the government (1946); Protector of Labour and Security for Chinese Affairs (1947); Resident, East Coast (1947); Commissioner of Immigration and Labour (1947–1951); member of the Legislative and Executive Councils (1950–1961); acting Financial Secretary (1951–52); Deputy Chief Secretary (1952–1956); representative of North Borneo at the coronation of Elizabeth II in the United Kingdom (1953); Secretary for Local Government, North Borneo, and Chairman of the Board of Education and the Town and Country Planning Board (1956–1961); acting Chief Secretary on occasion (1952–1960); Officer Administering the Government in 1958 and 1959, and acting High Commissioner of Brunei in 1959. He retired from service in 1961.

== Personal life and death ==
Gray was an active member of the Church of England; a member of United Society Partners in the Gospel, and Commissary to the Bishop of Jesselton. He was a life associate member of the North Borneo and United Kingdom branches of the Commonwealth Parliamentary Association, and chairman of the Borneo Mission Association from 1961 to 1976.

Gray married Penelope Townsend (MBE) in 1932.

Gray died on 11 March 1994, aged 89.

== Honours ==
Gray was appointed Officer of the Order of the British Empire (OBE) in the 1953 Coronation Honours. He was appointed Companion of the Order of St Michael and St George (CMG) in the 1958 New Year Honours.
