= James Nash (bishop) =

James Okey Nash (1862–1943) was the Anglican Coadjutor Bishop of Cape Town from 1917 until 1930.

Nash was educated at King William's College, Isle of Man; Hertford College, Oxford; and Ripon College Cuddesdon. He was ordained in 1888. After a curacy at St Andrews, Bethnal Green, he was at Pusey House, Oxford from 1889 to 1892. He was one of the original members of the Community of the Resurrection, Mirfield. He was Vicar of Radley from 1895 to 1898. He emigrated to South Africa in 1902 to be Chaplain to the Bishop of Pretoria, and subsequently served as Headmaster of St. John's College, Johannesburg from 1906 to 1917.

He died on 7 April 1943.
