= Alan Cornwall (cricketer) =

English cricketer and educationalist 1898–1984

Alan Edward Cripps Cornwall (12 August 1898 – 26 February 1984) was an English cricketer – a right-handed batsman who played for Gloucestershire – and an educationalist.

== Life and teaching ==
Cornwall was born in Coleford, Gloucestershire (then in the Monmouth registration district), where his father, Alan Whitmore Cornwall was Vicar.

Cornwall attended Marlborough College and subsequently returned to teach history there. He acted as a housemaster at Marlborough College for several decades, and as an officer of the Marlborough College Contingent of the Junior Training Corps in the Second World War. In February 1938 he headed a party of 30 public schoolboys on a visit to New Zealand.

Alan Cornwall never married. His younger brother, Nigel Cornwall, became a colonial bishop in the Anglican Church. Alan Cornwall died in retirement at Lustleigh, Devon in 1984.

== Cricketing ==
Cornwall gained fame as a schoolboy batsman by scoring three consecutive centuries for Marlborough College. He made a single first-class appearance for Gloucestershire, during the 1920 season, playing against Leicestershire. From the lower-middle order, he scored three runs in the first innings in which he batted, and two runs in the second. He was also a player of hockey and authored a chapter of a book on the subject.
