= Community of the Resurrection =

Religious community in the United Kingdom

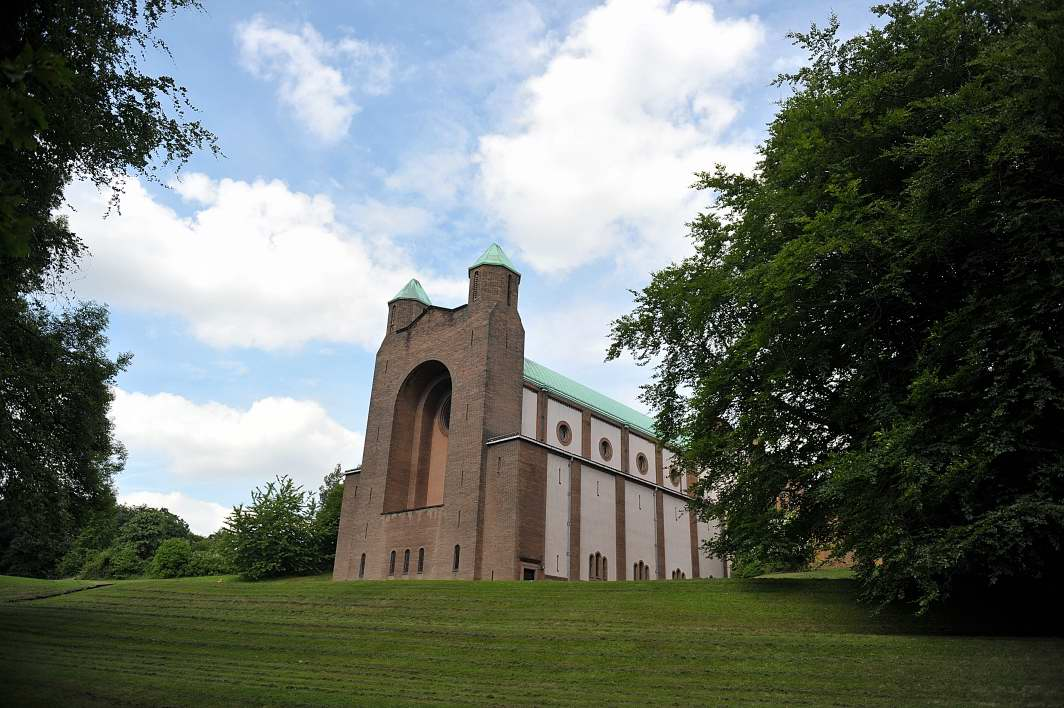
- Community church
- Community of the Resurrection
- OS grid reference: SE 19003 20729
- Country: England
- Denomination: Church of England
- Website: mirfield.org.uk

Administration
- Province: York
- Diocese: Leeds
- Archdeaconry: Halifax
- Deanery: Dewsbury
- Parish: Christ the King, Battyeford

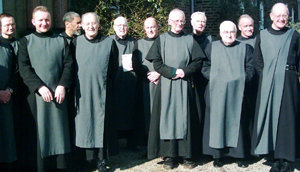
Some members of the community

The Community of the Resurrection (CR) is an Anglican religious community for men in England. It is based in Mirfield, West Yorkshire, and has 13 members as of January 2026. The community reflects Anglicanism in its broad nature and is strongly engaged in the life of the Anglican Communion. It also has a long tradition of ecumenical outlook and practice.

CR is dedicated to the mystery of Christ's resurrection. The Constitutions of the community state that:

the Community of the Resurrection is called specially to public, prophetic witness to the Christian hope of the Kingdom. The common life and corporate worship of its members is properly made visible in its works, which embrace social and missionary concern... The dedication to the Resurrection does not indicate an obligation to particular works or particular places, but rather a commitment to make public the fruits of the community life and worship in order to proclaim the world made new in Christ... its charism... is to live the baptismal vocation through a commitment to community life, sustained by common worship, and issuing in works that are primarily of a public character

== Engagement ==
Since its foundation, the community has been active in pastoral teaching and mission in different parts of the Anglican Communion. In the 21st century the House of the Resurrection is the motherhouse and centre of the activities of Community of the Resurrection in Mirfield, West Yorkshire, England.

In co-operation with the local diocese, CR runs the Mirfield Centre, which hosts conferences and other events for laity and clergy. Connected with the community are also several Church of England teaching institutions: the College of the Resurrection (which was founded by CR in 1903 as an Anglican theological training college), the Yorkshire Ministry Course (YMC) and the Diocesan School of Ministry. All these institutions are on the same campus at Mirfield.

In recent years numbers visiting Mirfield have increased dramatically, individuals and groups, on day-visits or longer stays, and this has brought a need for more buildings, including a projected new monastery alongside the community's church, for which funds are at present being raised. The community has a long-standing covenant relationship with the Catholic Benedictine St. Matthias' Abbey in Trier, Germany. Central to the work of the community are the activities in its grand church (designed by Walter Tapper), which has been through a comprehensive restoration and reordering from 2009 to 2012.

The community runs a retreat house with organised retreats (for individuals and groups) and has its own publishing house, Mirfield Publications.

As of April 2019, there are 19 oblate brothers living their lives in association with the community by the counsels of chastity, poverty and obedience, while continuing their ministry outside the community.

== History ==
=== Beginnings in Oxford ===
The Community of the Resurrection (CR) is a child of the Oxford Movement, the Catholic Revival in the Church of England in the 19th century. After several years of preparation 25 July 1892, St James Day, six priests founded a religious community in Pusey House, Oxford, where Charles Gore resided as the first principal of the house. Pusey House, however, was not suited for a religious community and the problem was solved when, the following year, Gore became the vicar of Radley, a few miles south of Oxford. The six brethren moved into the vicarage and "started to learn how to ride a bicycle", as Gore expressed it. The founders of CR wanted the community to develop its own charism based on pastoral involvement. They were all Christian Socialists challenged by the poverty of the working classes and their strong sense of vocation to this group of people made them look for a new home in heavily industrialised Northern England.

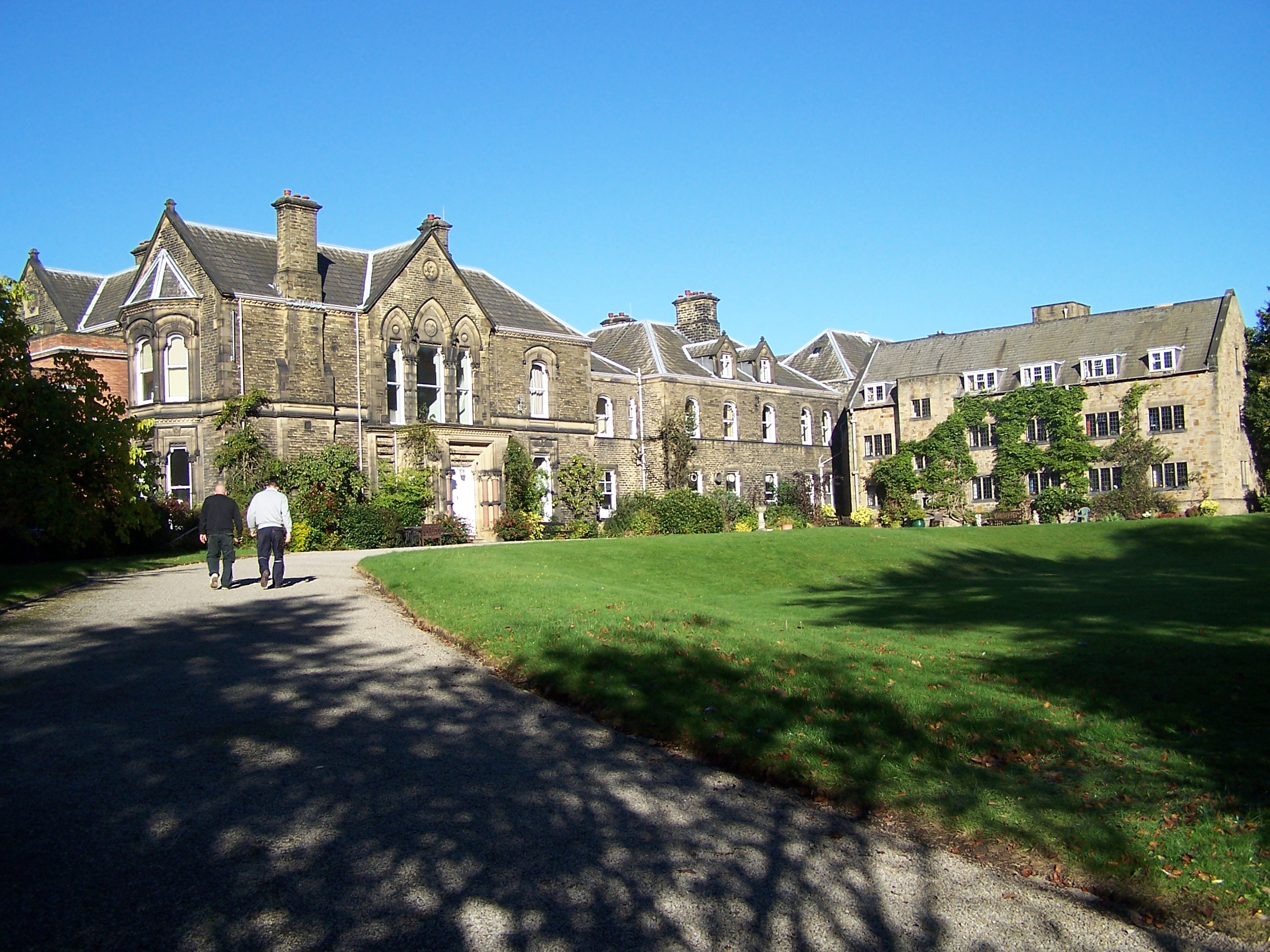
House of the Resurrection, Mirfield

=== Expansion in Mirfield ===
A large house in the middle of the Diocese of Wakefield, West Yorkshire, seemed to fit the purpose. In 1898 the community moved to Mirfield, and this became the centre of the community's activities. Charles Gore had become a canon of Westminster Abbey in 1894, and though he was officially in charge as superior until 1902, it was under his successor, Walter Howard Frere, that CR developed its character as a religious community. The brethren regarded their ministry as closely connected to the Church of England, and as an extension of their parish ministry, one of their first tasks was to found a theological training college for men without means. The College of the Resurrection opened in 1902 and has trained ordinands for the priesthood until today. Because part of the teaching was done at University of Leeds, a hostel was built and run in Leeds from 1904 to 1976. Developing a large library of theological literature was a natural thing for a community like CR, but the college made it even more necessary.

Another development was a fraternity for priests and lay people associated with CR and its rule of life. The Fraternity of Companions was established in 1903 and the C.R. Quarterly became the link between them and the community. An order of oblates was formed in 1931 for celibate men who wanted to share the discipline of the religious life with the brethren in a ministry outside the community.

Retreats became an important element of the monastic work. Brethren led retreats in many parts of the country, and, as a part of the continuous extension of the site in Mirfield, a retreat house was built in 1914 and extended to its present size in 1926.

As Anglican Catholics, the brethren laid great store by the beauty of the liturgy, and Walter Frere, a fine musician, was particularly interested in developing the liturgy. He was from an early stage, involved in scholarly work on the chant and the daily offices. To realise this purpose the community needed a proper church and on St Mary Magdalen's Day, 22 July 1911, the foundation stone of a great church was laid. Though the huge scale of the original plan was not followed, it remains an impressive and unusual building. The western half, completed in 1938, follows a simplified design by the architect's son, Michael Tapper.

The celebrations were not limited to indoors. A quarry next to the house was turned into an open-air theatre shortly after the brethren had arrived at the house and used for sermons, Bible classes, plays and political meetings. The grounds were used for big day events of which the yearly Commemoration Day, celebrating the founding of the college, was the greatest.

=== Engagement in southern England ===
Though the community left Oxford, southern England was not forgotten. After his ministry in Westminster, Charles Gore became, successively, Bishop of Worcester, Bishop of Birmingham and Bishop of Oxford and continued his strong focus on mission among the workers. London seemed to be an obvious place to establish a mission as brothers had lived with Gore in Westminster. The community was offered a house in South Kensington in 1914 and the brethren became involved in ministries for the soldiers of the First World War there. After the war a bigger house was found near Holland Park in the same area. The London priory remained there until 1968 (at 8 Holland Park, known as St Paul's Priory). Retreats, missions and teaching were the main purposes of the house. The London ministry came under royal protection when it moved to the Royal Foundation of St Katharine in Stepney. Here the priory shared a city ministry with the Community of St. Andrew and the Sisters of the Church until 1993, when the time had come for CR to form its own priory again. CR moved to an abandoned clergy house in Covent Garden and ran a city ministry in the middle of London until 2003.

The community established a retreat house in the south as well, first in St Leonards, Sussex (1931–1948) and later in Hemingford Grey, Cambridgeshire (1950–2010).

=== Ministry outside Britain ===
CR's ministry in Africa, which became a strong mark of the community in the 20th century, began early. In 1902 one of the aspirants of the early days in Oxford, William Carter, by now the Bishop of Pretoria, invited the brethren to help rebuild his diocese after the devastation of the Boer War. In response three brethren went to Johannesburg and founded a house to work with African miners and do theological training for local Africans. The community undertook the responsibility of St. John's College in the same city four years later. When the brethren handed the college back to the diocese in 1934 it had become a flourishing education centre. In that year the community was asked to run the parish of Christ the King in the black suburb Sophiatown.

In 1911 a new priory and theological training college (St Peter's Theological College) was opened in the suburb of Rosettenville, which grew steadily with schools for black children and teenagers added in 1922. This college had a great influence on the Church of Southern Africa in the second half of the 20th century.

As in South Africa, the Bishop of Southern Rhodesia, Frederic Hicks Beaven invited the community to run a mission in Penhalonga from 1914. This became the centre of the brethren's activities in Zimbabwe until it was handed over to local authorities in 1983 shortly after the civil war had ended. The work in Zimbabwe concentrated on running the school for children in Penhalonga and pastoral and educational work in the area, the so-called "treck jobs". There have remained friendly and caring connections to the Anglican Church in Zimbabwe until this day, in the last years especially through the "Tariro" orphanage project led by Nicholas Stebbing CR.

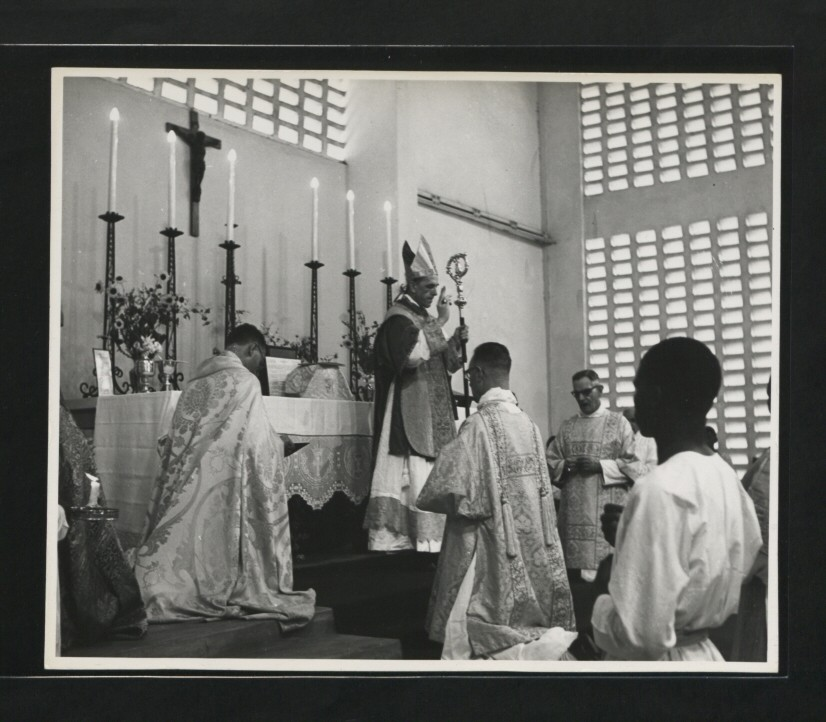
Trevor Huddleston as Bishop of Masasi

The Rt Rev Noel Hudson was appointed Bishop of Labuan and Sarawak in 1931. He invited the Community of the Resurrection to send some members to Kuching. Five members arrived in 1933, and the following year the Ordination Test School was opened in Kuching with six candidates. Of the six, Hope Hugh, Lim Yong Chua, Martin Nanang and Ng Thau Sin proceeded to ordination as deacons in 1936 and priests in 1937. In 1937 the last member of the CR left and the school closed. (In 1952 the House of the Epiphany was established as the Diocese's theological college.)

=== Post-war challenges ===
The number of brethren in the community and the extent of its activities reached a peak around 1960 with over 90 brothers engaged in 12 houses spread over three continents.

A new part of the world was explored when the community accepted an invitation to run Codrington Theological College in Barbados in the West Indies from 1955 to 1969. Having a stable religious community on the site, where students came from a far distance, was a great help for this widespread diocese.

A similar invitation was given from the Church in Wales, where the bishops wanted the charism of CR to be spread among university students. The hostel of St Teilo in Cardiff was made into a priory from 1945 to 1968 with a focus on retreats and student work.

The greatest engagement, however, was in South Africa. A new priory was established in the Northern Transvaal/Sekukuniland in South Africa from 1945 to 1962. The engagement in the struggle against Apartheid became a very visible part of the mission, which made the community famous outside the church with Trevor Huddleston as the most well known of the brethren. The political support to the black population had consequences. The South African government forced the college to move from Rosettenville and the priory in Sophiatown was closed down in 1962. CR continued to do pastoral work in Johannesburg and were able to continue the theological training when the Anglican bishops of Southern Africa asked the community to be a part of a new ecumenical college in Alice, Eastern Cape. The first brethren arrived in 1963 and here the brethren became a part of the fight against Apartheid. After some turbulent years when the theological college was forced to move twice, the community decided to hand the education over to South Africans in 1977. The priory in Rosettenville closed in 1986. A house was run in Stellenbosch from 1968 to 1976, where brothers were involved in running the parish and taking care of the Anglican students. The century of work in South Africa ended in Turffontein, where the community gathered its mission in a priory from 1986 to 2006. The brethren were involved in typical CR work: pastoral care, retreats and conferences connected to Anglican life.

The radical changes of society and church life in the United Kingdom from the 1960s and onwards was a great challenge for CR as well as all other religious communities. The attitude in the new generations towards religious commitment changed. Within the communities fundamental questions of relevance, order of life and ministry were asked and discussed. Several left the communities and fewer people came to explore vocation to the religious life. Though CR was one of the strongest and most committed communities, it did not avoid the struggle and it came to a serious crisis when the superior, with short notice, left the community in 1974.

A new vision and vocation for northern England became active in the 1970s. The loss of spiritual understanding and knowledge of prayer in the great cities was a great concern for the church and contribution from religious communities in this vacuum was obvious. CR supported the vocation of Augustine Hoey CR to make a flat in Hulme, a poor part of Manchester, into a home of prayer in 1973. The project was moved to a redundant vicarage in Sunderland in 1977 and named "Emmaus". Hoey was joined by other brethren and the project lasted until 1993.

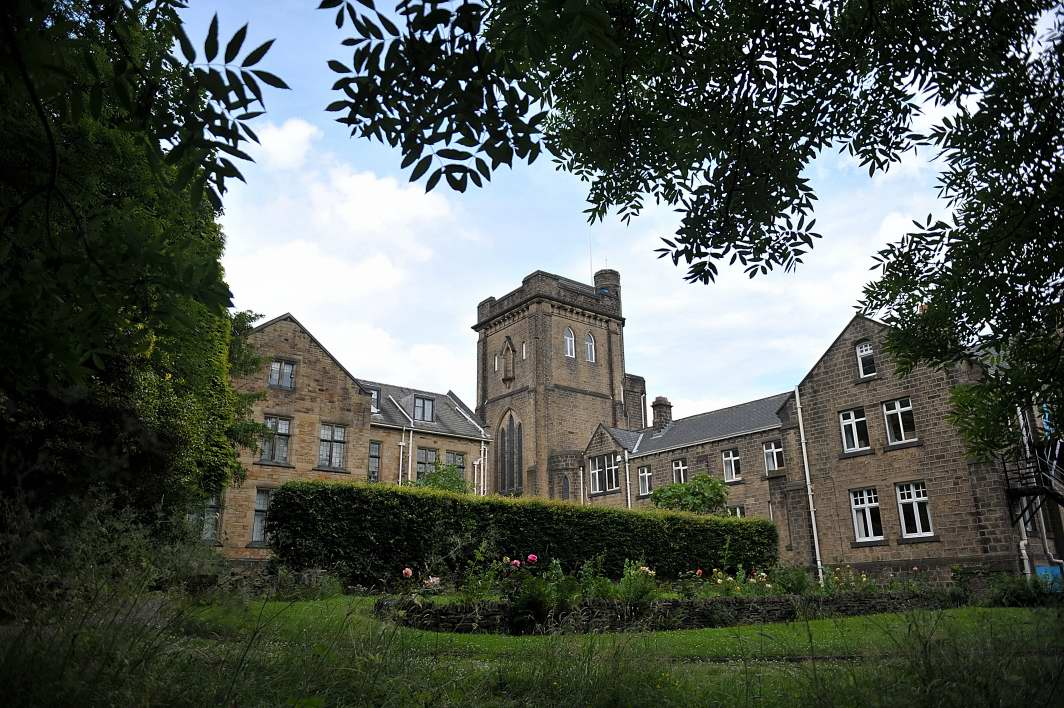
College of the Resurrection

=== Church education, ecumenism and monasticism in the 21st century ===
When the mission closed down in South Africa in 2006, the House of the Resurrection in Mirfield was the only house of CR. This had not been the case since the community moved to Yorkshire in 1898. This was an opportunity to rethink the charism and mission of CR into a new century.

The College of the Resurrection has been going for more than a century and is still an important ministry in Mirfield. In 2004 the community created a new governing body drawing in a wide range of expertise from outside, but the Community retains a strong involvement in governance, and provided a brother as College Principal until 2019. It is still the aim to provide students with a formation that draws on the living monastic tradition, while equipping them for ministry in the 21st century. As pastoral formation developed in the northern dioceses the college made a partnership with the Northern Ordination Course, later to become the Yorkshire Ministry Course (from 1996). The community decided to open an educational centre, the Mirfield Centre, in 1998, with its own Director, and a mission to contribute to the Christian formation of the laity in particular. In 2007 the Wakefield School of Ministry made this the centre of its work.

2011 saw the foundation of the Mirfield Liturgical Institute, which promotes scholarly study of the liturgy, with a long-term aim of lay education as well.

There is a long tradition of ecumenical contacts and relations in the community. As a part of his monastic studies Walter Frere had visited Catholic clergy and monasteries in France before he joined the community. In 1928 he became the first Anglican president of the Fellowship of St Alban and St Sergius after a visit to Russia in 1909. Strong links to Catholics and Orthodox have remained in CR and has become even stronger in the age of globalism. On the initiative of the Catholic Benedictine abbey of Trier in Germany, an official friendship, which grew from several visits, was made in 1983, and several brethren have built up links with the Eastern Orthodox Church in Romania in a mutual spiritual exchange. There are also links to European Lutherans through the international ecumenical networks of monastics.

The much-needed refurbishment and reordering of the church in 2011 created a renewed and functional space. The next phase will involve updating the old house to better meet the needs of the resident community.

== Influence ==
The community has fostered 11 bishops in different parts of the Anglican Communion. Both of the two founders became bishops in the Church of England. Charles Gore was Bishop of Worcester (1902–1905), Birmingham (1905–1911) and Oxford (1911–1919), and Walter Howard Frere became Bishop of Truro (1923–1935). Timothy Rees became Bishop of Llandaff (1931–1939) in Wales, and Thomas Hannay became Bishop of Argyll and The Isles in Scotland (1942–1962), and Primus of the Scottish Episcopal Church from 1952 to his retirement in 1962.

Most of the bishops of CR have been connected to the Anglican expansion through mission work outside Great Britain. The third bishop of the six founders, James Okey Nash, became coadjutor bishop of the Anglican Diocese of Cape Town from 1917 to 1930. Nash was the first in a row of CR bishops in Africa. A native born South African, Simeon Nkoane, became Desmond Tutu's assistant bishop in the Anglican Diocese of Johannesburg from 1982 to his death in 1989. Robert Mercer was Bishop of Matabeleland in Zimbabwe from 1977 to 1989. He then became a bishop of a Continuing Anglican church, the Anglican Catholic Church of Canada, from 1989 to 2005 and later joined the Anglican-tradition Personal Ordinariate of Our Lady of Walsingham within the Catholic Church in 2012, remaining, however, an external member of CR. Two CR brethren eventually reached archiepiscopal status: Thomas Hannay in Scotland and Trevor Huddleston, Archbishop of the Anglican Church of the Province of the Indian Ocean from 1978 to 1983. Before that he was bishop of the Anglican Diocese of Masasi in Tanzania (1960–1968), the suffragan Bishop of Stepney in the Diocese of London (1968–1978) and bishop of the Diocese of Mauritius in 1978.

In Asia, William Rupert Mounsey was Bishop of Labuan and Sarawak from 1909 to 1916 and Victor Shearburn was Bishop of Rangoon from 1955 to 1966. The community also had a bishop in the Anglican Diocese of Bermuda, an extraprovincial diocese of Canterbury, with Anselm Genders from 1977 to 1982, who had served previously in both Africa and the West Indies.

CR has had an influence in excess of its numbers in the development of the Anglican Church in South Africa, especially in the ministry of the brethren Raymond Raynes and Trevor Huddleston in Sophiatown and in the influence of Huddleston and the Community of the Resurrection on Desmond Tutu. The existence of St John's College, (Johannesburg) and its ethos are also almost solely due to its founding fathers; James Okey Nash, Thomson, Alston, Hill and at least 11 others, all of whom were community members. It has been a role model for many Southern African schools.

Other influential members have included Robert Hugh Benson (who, however, left CR when he was received into the Catholic Church), John Neville Figgis, Edward Keble Talbot, Lionel S. Thornton, Martin Jarrett-Kerr, Harry Williams, Geoffrey Beaumont and Benedict Green.

== Visitors ==
Dietrich Bonhoeffer visited CR in Mirfield in 1935 and, as a result, introduced the recitation of parts of Psalm 119 as part of the daily prayer of the seminary for the Confessing Church. It also inspired him to write his famous book Life Together (Gemeinsames Leben).

Some notable South African brethren completed their novitiates at Mirfield. They include the late Fr Leo Rakale and Bishop Simeon Nkoane (Bishop of Johannesburg West including Soweto) who died young. The Bishop Simeon Memorial Trust is an educational charity founded in London and RSA. The Trevor Huddleston CR Memorial Centre in Sophiatown, Johannesburg, is a locally registered charity (non-profit company) and seeks to continue the legacy of Bishop Trevor, particularly in its work with young people. A new building, the Fr Trevor Huddleston memorial building was opened in September 2015 and hosts programmes from small business development, youth training, to arts, culture and heritage work, aims bring people together, promote community development, as well as remembering the forced removals from Sophiatown which sparked Bishop Trevor's seminal book 'Naught for your comfort'. more: www.trevorhuddleston.org www.sophiatown.net Visitors can take a guided tour of the area, the small museum, and enjoy the garden cafe, as well as hire the venue and attend concerts. All the profits are used to support the work with young people.

== List of superiors ==
The head of the Community of the Resurrection is known as the superior.

- Charles Gore (1892 to 1902); known as the Senior, later became Bishop of Worcester, Bishop of Birmingham and Bishop of Oxford
- Walter Frere (1902 to 1913); first superior, later became Bishop of Truro
- George Longridge (1914 to 1917)
- Walter Frere (1917 to 1922); second term as superior
- Keble Talbot (1922 to 1940)
- Raymond Raynes (1940 to 1957)
- Jonathan Graham (1957 to 1965)
- Hugh Bishop (1965 to 1974)
- Eric Simmons (1974 to 1987)
- Silvanus Berry (1987 to 1998)
- Crispin Harrison (1998 to 2003)
- George Guiver (2003 to 2018)
- Oswin Gartside (2018 to present)

== Notes and references ==
- Wilkinson, Alan (1992). The Community of the Resurrection: A Centenary History. SCM Press. ISBN 978-0-334-02526-9.
- Stebbing, Nicholas; Gordon-Taylor, Benjamin (2011). Walter Frere: Scholar, Monk, Bishop. Hymns Ancient and Modern Ltd. ISBN 978-1-85311-868-5.
- Community of the Resurrection (1991) Constitutions. Community of the Resurrection
- CR Review Quarterly available from The Editors, CR Review...contact via CR website
