= St. Thomas's Cathedral, Kuching =

St. Thomas' Cathedral, Kuching
- Malay: Katedral St. Thomas, Kuching
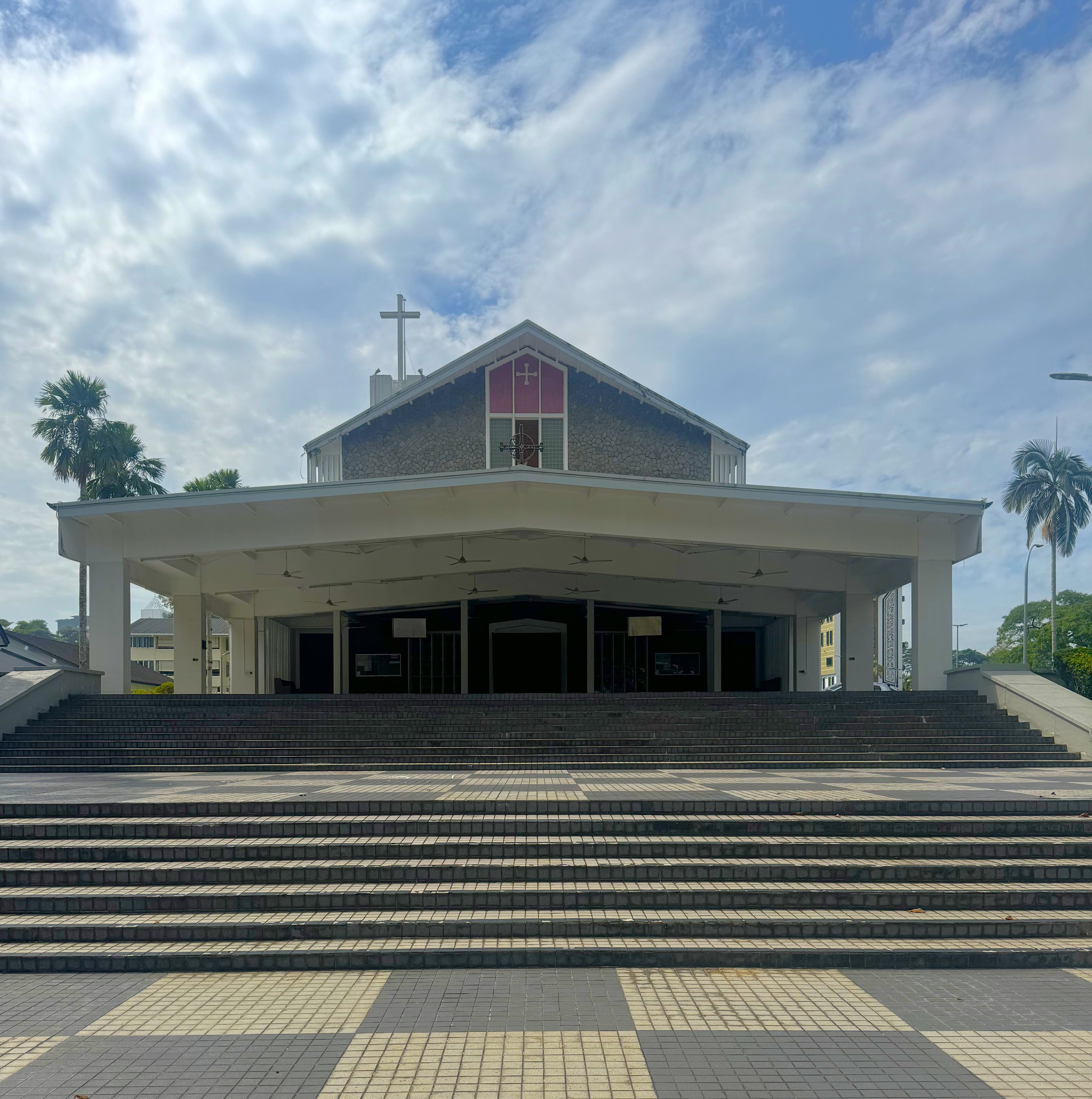
- St. Thomas' Cathedral, Kuching
- 1°33′26.70106″N 110°20′43.13314″E
- Location: Kuching, Sarawak
- Country: Malaysia
- Denomination: Anglican

History
- Status: Cathedral
- Dedication: Thomas the Apostle
- Consecrated: 22 January 1851 (first cathedral); 9 June 1956 (current cathedral)

Architecture
- Years built: 28 August 1849 (first cathedral); 27 January 1955 (current cathedral)

Administration
- Diocese: Diocese of Kuching

St. Thomas's Cathedral (Malay: Katedral St. Thomas) is the cathedral of the Diocese of Kuching of the Anglican Church of the Province of South East Asia, located in Kuching, Sarawak, Malaysia. It is the episcopal see of the Anglican Bishop of Kuching and the mother church of the diocese.

== History ==
A Mission was sent to Borneo in 1847 at the request of Sir James Brooke. On the 28th of August 1849, the first foundation wood of the church was placed in a ceremony, which was attended by the Rajah and Rt. Revd. Francis McDougall. The cathedral was then consecrated by Bishop Daniel Wilson of Calcutta (within whose jurisdiction of Kuching then lay) on January 22nd, 1851 and dedicated it in honour of Saint Thomas the Apostle. This church was made of wood.

By the mid-20th century, the wooden structure had deteriorated due to prolonged exposure to tropical conditions. During the Japanese occupation of Sarawak, the building suffered neglect and was used as a store by occupying forces. Combined with the post-war growth of the Anglican Church in Kuching, this led to the conclusion that repairing the building was no longer practical, and a new cathedral was required.

The foundation stone of the current cathedral was laid by Princess Marina, Duchess of Kent during a visit to Sarawak on 15 October 1952. The cathedral was then consecrated on 9 June 1956 by Nigel Edmund Cornwall, in the presence of the Officer Administering the Government and representatives of the wider Anglican Communion, including the Archbishop of Brisbane. The ceremony was attended by more than 1,000 clergy and laity from across the diocese and beyond.

== Gallery ==
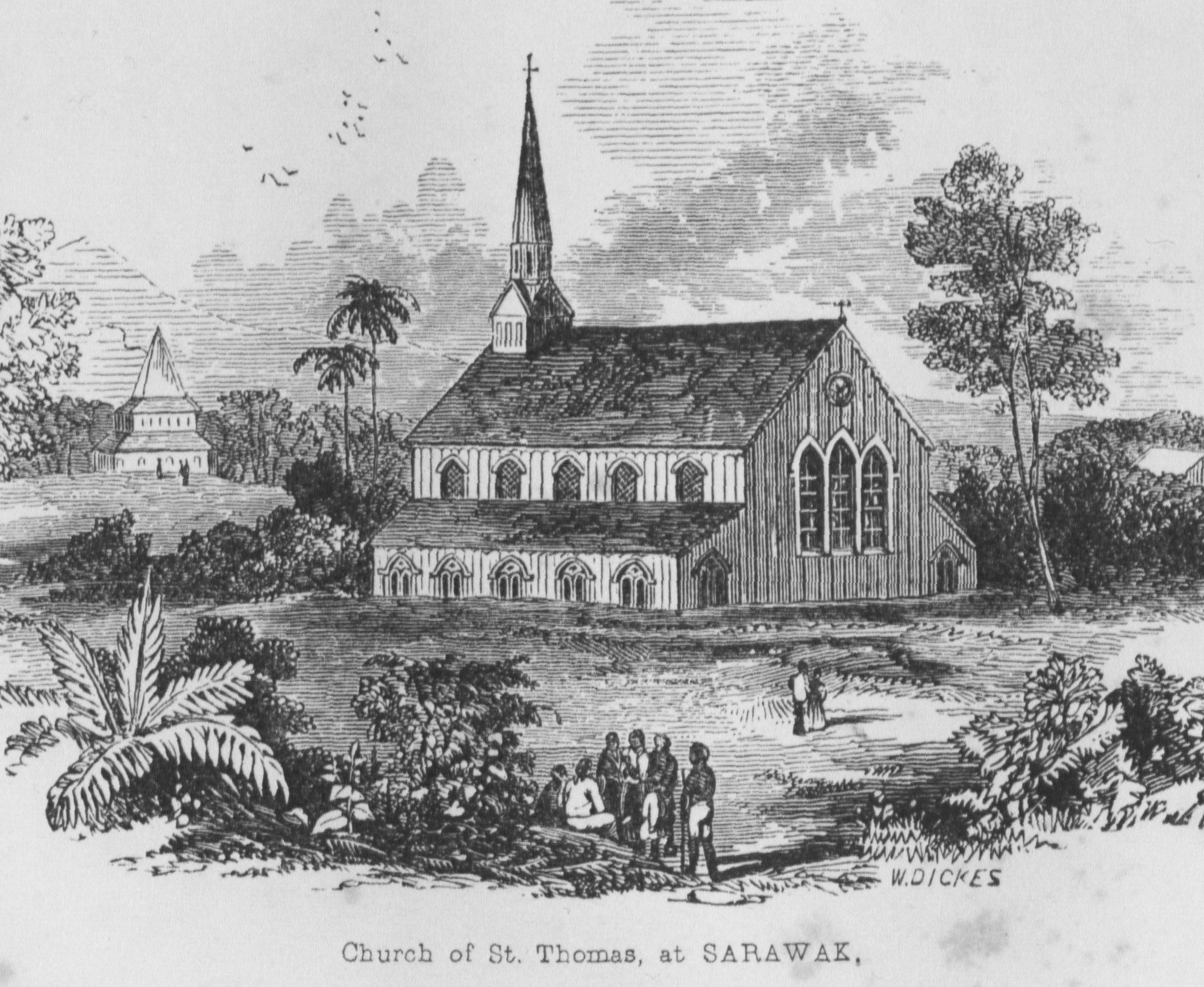
Illustration of St. Thomas's Church in 1851

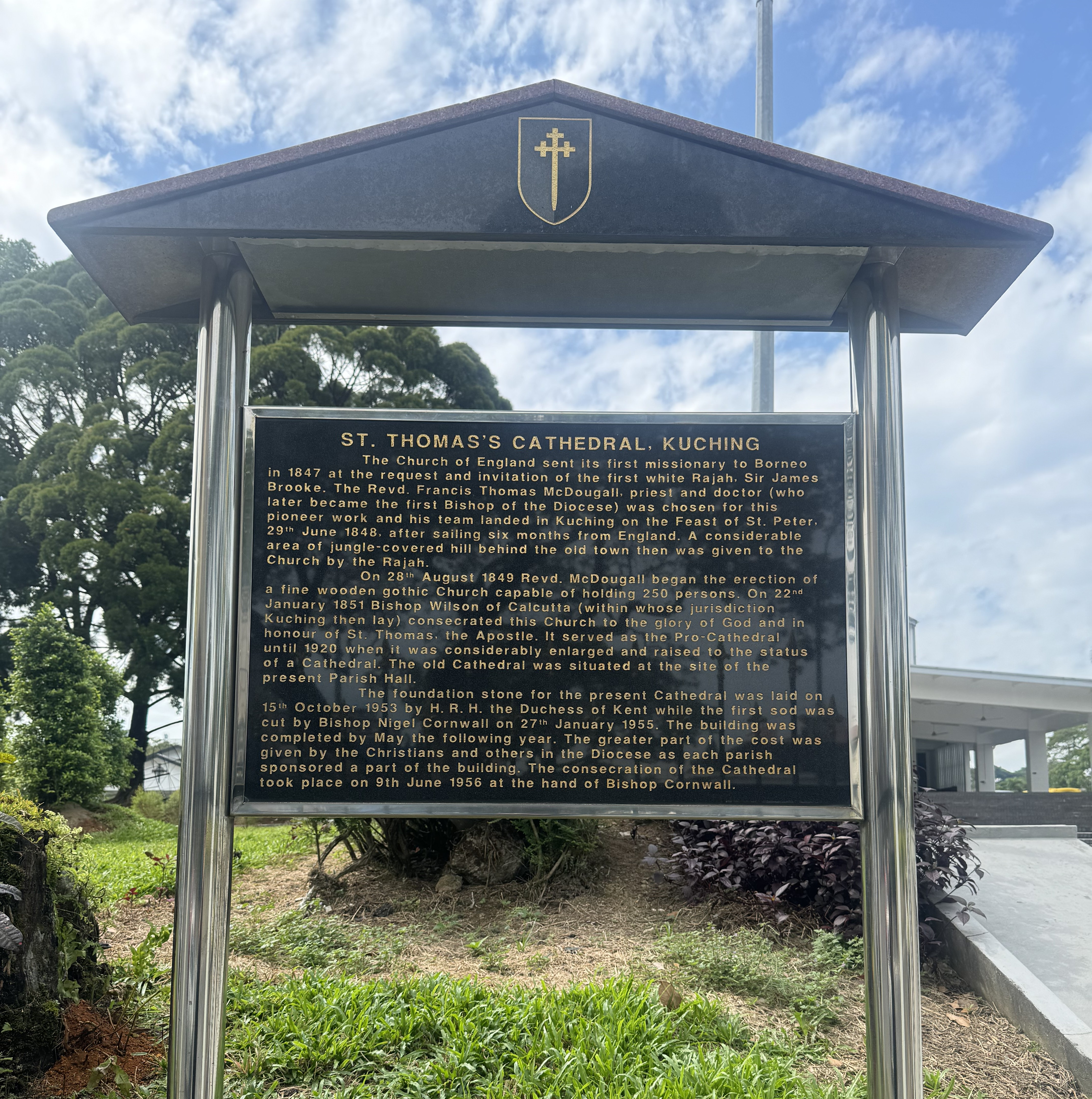
A plaque with historical explanation of St. Thomas's Cathedral

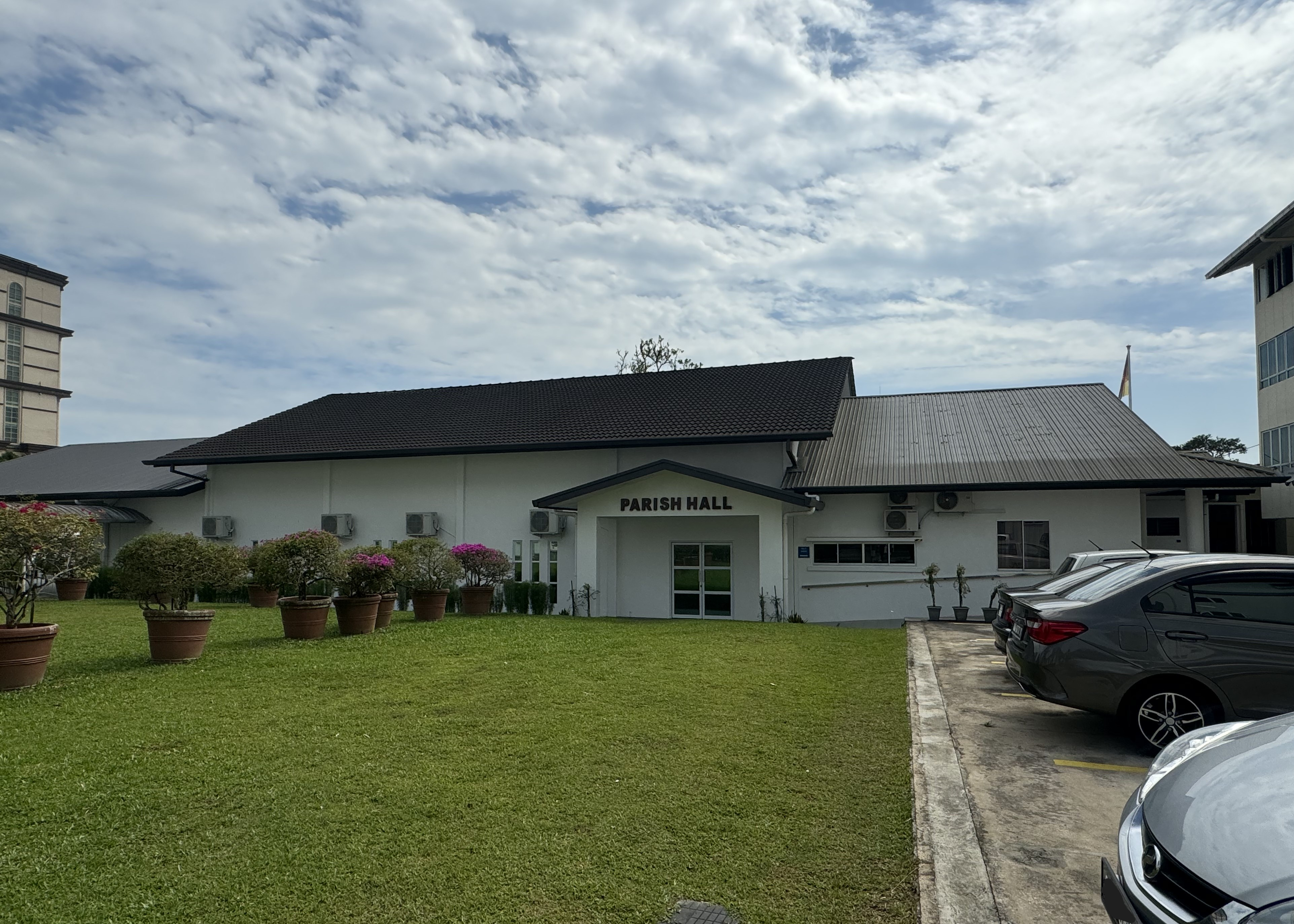
Parish hall of the cathedral

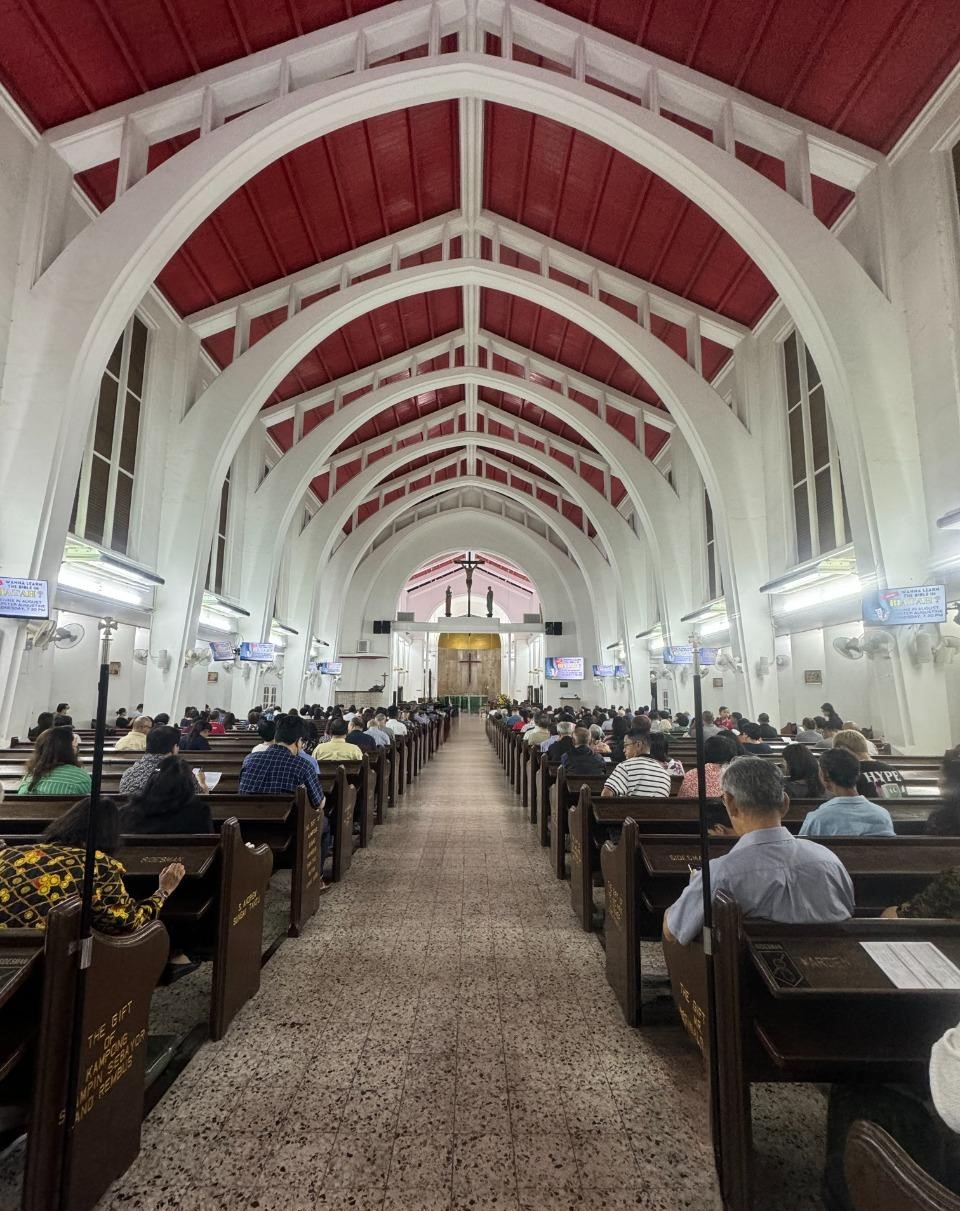
Interior view of the cathedral
