= 20th Century Church Light Music Group =

Group of composers

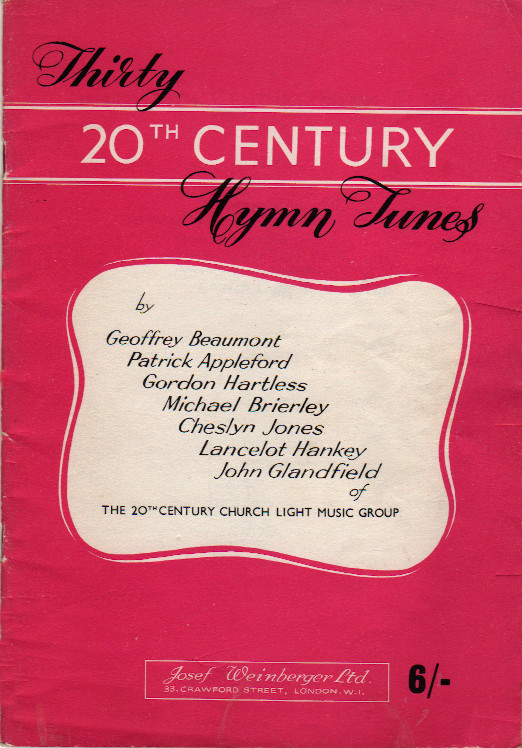
One of the group's early publications (1960)

The 20th Century Church Light Music Group was set up at the end of the 1950s by a number of British musicians who felt that church music was increasingly out of touch with modern society. These included Geoffrey Beaumont, Patrick Appleford, Gordon Hartless and Michael Brierley. According to Appleford, they sought 'a musical lingua franca or “folk” music in the sense of ordinary folk's music rather than that 'of the pop music industry'. The group published numerous hymns and recordings between 1960 and 1965, and had a significant influence on church music.
