= Geoffrey Beaumont =

British priest, monk and musician

Geoffrey Beaumont MBE CR (1903–1970) was a British Anglican priest and monk of the Community of the Resurrection who was also a composer of popular songs and hymn tunes. After graduation he attended Ely Theological College and was ordained in 1932 to a curacy in Nunhead. During the war he served as a chaplain in the RNVR, for which he was awarded the MBE. From 1947 to 1952 he was chaplain of Trinity College, Cambridge. In 1961 he entered the Community of the Resurrection.

With Patrick Appleford he founded the '20th Century Church Light Music Group' and edited several new collections of hymns of which many are found in various hymnals and are still sung today. Probably his best known hymn tune is "Hatherop Castle" set for the words "O Jesus I have promised". His Twentieth Century Folk Mass (1957) was also very popular in the 1960s.
