= Patrick Appleford =

English Anglican priest and hymnwriter

The Reverend Patrick Appleford
- Portrait photo of Patrick Appleford
- Born: 4 May 1925
- Died: 9 December 2018 (aged 93)
- Education: Trinity College, Cambridge
- Occupations: Cleric, hymnodist

Ecclesiastical career
- Church: Church of England
- Congregations: Bishops' College, Cheshunt, Cathedral of the Holy Cross, Lusaka, Chelmsford Cathedral
- Known for: Lord Jesus Christ (Living Lord), New English Mass

Patrick Robert Norman Appleford (4 May 1925 – 9 December 2018) was an English Anglican priest and hymnwriter. Along with Geoffrey Beaumont and others he was a founder of the "Twentieth Century Church Light Music Group" around 1960, which significantly affected the development of hymn-writing and hymn-singing across English-speaking churches from that time onwards.

== Life ==
Appleford found his vocation to the priesthood at Trinity College, Cambridge, where Beaumont was chaplain. He studied for the ministry at Chichester and served his first curacy at All Saints Poplar, in the East End of London from 1952 to 1958. He then served as chaplain of Bishops' College, Cheshunt (1958–61). From 1961 to 1966 he served with USPG, then moved to Lusaka, Zambia as Dean and Rector of Cathedral of the Holy Cross until 1972. On his return to England he was curate-in-charge of Sutton St Nicholas with Sutton St Michael (1973–75), then Chelmsford Diocesan Director of Education (1975–90) and Canon of Chelmsford Cathedral (1978–90).

== Music ==
His hymn "Lord Jesus Christ (Living Lord)", for which he wrote both music and text, is found in at least seventeen hymnals worldwide and has been translated into several languages. The hymn evidences the influence of popular music and skiffle on Appleford's writing, and has been likened to Cliff Richard and the Drifters' 1959 hit, "Living Doll". When aged 18, the pop singer Garry Mills recorded several of Appleford's hymns for Oriole Records (UK), including "Living Lord", "Wonderful News" and "Rhythm is Religion".

The music of his "New English Mass" set the emerging modern-language English texts of the Church of England communion service for congregational accessibility, establishing a trend which has been followed by many other composers of liturgical music.
