= Taee Village =

Taee Village (formerly Munggu Babi (meaning, "Cold Hill") early 1900s, better known in Malay as Kampung Taee/Kampung Taie/Kampung Ta-ee) is a village in Serian, Sarawak. About 60 km from Kuching, Kampung Taee is situated directly at the foot of Mount Sadong, Serian. The village was moved and split into two villages, Kampung Taee and Kampung Plaman Nyabet. The village had a population of about 2200 people, the majority being Bidayuh, as well as Chinese, Malay, Iban & Indians. The language used there is Bidayuh Bukar.

== Education ==
Two schools were built near the village. SK St John, Taee, was established in the 1930s as the primary school in the village and SMK Taee (also known as SMK Batu Ajung) was built a few kilometres from the village and situated at the foot of Mount Sadong in the 1980s for students to further their education. Before SMK Taee was established, most students had to attend other secondary schools such as Dragon School (now known as Kolej Tun Abdul Razak/SMK Tun Abdul Razak) while others furthered their study in Kuching at schools such as SMK St. Thomas.
