= Batu Niah =

Town in Sarawak, Malaysia

Coordinates: 3°48′0″N 113°45′0″E

Batu Niah is a small town in Miri Division, Sarawak, Malaysia. It is located at 3°48'0" N, 113°45'0" E on the island of Borneo.

Batu Niah is Malay for "Niah Cave", and it is the nearest town to the Niah Caves, in Niah National Park, which are about 3 kilometres away.

It is about 1.75 hours from Miri and 2 hours (120 km) from Bintulu.

About 1859 people live there.
