= Borneo Mission Association =

The Borneo Mission Association was founded in 1909 by Bishop W. R. Mounsey to assist the work of the Church of England in Labuan, Sarawak and British North Borneo.

It ceased operation in 2015, with its remaining funds transferred to the United Society.

== See also ==
- Diocese of Kuching
- Singapore and West Malaysia Diocesan Association
- Church of the Province of South East Asia
