= Made Katib =

Malaysian Anglican bishop (1942–2013)

Datuk Made anak Katib (23 January 1942 – 23 January 2013) was a Malaysian former Anglican Bishop of the Diocese of Kuching. He held the position from 1996 until 2007.

An ethnic Biatah Bidayuh, he was the first Bishop of the diocese to emerge from the Bidayuh Dayak community.

== Early life and education ==
Born to the family of the late Katib anak Nanja and the late Nyang anak Janggok in Senah Negeri (what is now Kampung Annah Rais), Kuching, Sarawak, the former bishop was a British-trained priest who hailed from Padawan, Kuching.

Before being ordained as a priest, the late Made studied at the University of Leeds, in Yorkshire, England. He took a general degree with three core subjects – English, history and bible knowledge and graduated in 1966.

Following his graduation, he furthered his priesthood studies at College of the Resurrection at Mirfield in 1966. In 1968, he sat for his General Ordination Examination – which all British-trained priests were required to obtain.

== Ministry ==
The late Made started his ministry as a deacon on 22 September 1968 and a year later was ordained as a priest by the Diocese of Kuching's first indigenous bishop, the late Rt Revd Datuk Basil Temenggong. During his time as a priest, he served in many places in Sarawak before being promoted to Bishop.

He was enthroned as the 12th Bishop of the Anglican Diocese of Kuching on 20 November 1995, succeeding John Leong Chee Yun. The late Made retired from the ministry on 23 January 2007, which was also his 65th birthday.

He dedicated 38 years of his life to the ministry. For his service and contributions to the Church and state over the years, he was conferred honours by the state government with the medals decorated such as Pingat Terpuji Jubli Perak (1988) and Pegawai Bintang Sarawak (1994), both awarded by Tun Ahmad Zaidi Adruce (b. 1926 – d. 2000) and conferred a Datukship or honorific knighthood granted with the title Panglima Gemilang Bintang Kenyalang (2002) which carries the Malaysian title of "Datuk", awarded by Tun Abang Muhammad Salahuddin Abang Barieng (b. 1921 – d. 2022) on his 81st birthday in that year.

== Death ==
Made died on 6 pm local time, at the Sarawak General Hospital on his 71st birthday. He is survived by his wife Datin Matilda Thomas Ng and daughter Elvina Mary.

== See also ==
- Bishop of Kuching
- Church of the Province of South East Asia
