= Nicholas Allenby =

Anglican bishop in Malaysia

David Howard Nicholas Allenby SSM, (28 January 1909 – 28 February 1995) was an English clergyman in the Anglican Church and a member of the religious order the Society of the Sacred Mission. He held the position of Bishop of Kuching from 1962 until 1968, and thereafter was an assistant bishop in the Diocese of Worcester.

== Early life ==
Allenby was born in Essex in 1909, the son of William Allenby, an actor and stage manager, and his wife Irene Lambert Allenby (née Spratly), a teacher. Allenby joined the Society of the Sacred Mission at the age of 19, and was professed in 1933.

== Clerical career ==
He trained for ordination at Kelham Theological College and was ordained deacon in 1934 and priest in 1935. He was then a tutor at Kelham (1936–44) and then Rector of St Michael and All Angels, Averham with Kelham (1944–57). During the latter incumbency he was also Rural Dean of Newark (1955–57). He was also a member of the Church Assembly (the predecessor of the General Synod). In 1957 he went to Australia as Warden of the Society's theological college, St Michael's House, and Prior of the attached Priory. In the same year he was awarded a Lambeth MA. He was Warden of the Community of the Holy Name from 1961 to 1962.

In 1962 he was raised to the episcopate as Bishop of Kuching in Sarawak which, in 1963, became part of the new state of Malaysia. It was Allenby who first mooted the idea of a Province of South East Asia, in 1963: the Church of the Province of South East Asia finally came into existence in 1996, over 30 years later. He retired from Kuching in 1968, being replaced by Basil Temenggong, the first native Sarawakian bishop.

After his return from Malaysia in 1968, he was then an assistant bishop in the Diocese of Worcester until 1991. He was also Chaplain to St Oswald's Hospital, Worcester (1973–74). Allenby was an original trustee of Holland House, the Worcester diocesan retreat house at Cropthorne.

== Personal life ==
Allenby died in 1995, aged 86. At the end of his life he was at Willen Hospice, founded by the Society in 1979 as the Hospice of St Mary and St John and named for the Kelham Rood, which was then located in the garden of the Priory in Willen. He is buried in the churchyard of St Mary Magdalene, Willen, along with other members of the Society.
