= Francis Hollis =

British clergyman

Francis Septimus Hollis (10 November 1884 – 4 February 1955) was a British clergyman in the Anglican Church. He held the position of Bishop of Labuan and Sarawak in Southeast Asia from 1938 until 1948.

Hollis was the son of George Hollis, of the Inner Temple. He was educated at St George's School, Harpenden, and in Germany and France. He became a Fellow of the Surveyors' Institution in 1908, and entered Dorchester Missionary College, Oxfordshire in 1910. He was ordained in 1914. He served as Curate of Ashby-de-la-Zouch from 1913–1916.

Hollis first went to Sarawak, Borneo in 1916, serving as Assistant Priest at the St. Thomas' Cathedral at Kuching from 1916–1923, and then as Priest in Charge of the Land Dayak mission of St James, Quop and Tai, from 1923–1928. He was Principal of St Thomas' School from 1928–1938. In 1934 he was made Archdeacon of Sarawak, and was consecrated Bishop of Labuan and Sarawak in 1938, along with Grosvenor Miles, who was consecrated assistant bishop of Madagascar. They were ordained into bishop's orders at St Mary-at-Lambeth on 7 June 1938, by Cosmo Lang, Archbishop of Canterbury.

Hollis was interned at Batu Lintang camp near Kuching for three and a half years from 1942 until 1945, and this period of internment seriously undermined his health. Hollis's eyesight was particularly badly affected. In 1948 he resigned the see after serving for 32 years in Sarawak. After the devastation of World War II, the diocese of Labuan and the bishopric of Sarawak were joined into the diocese of Borneo; Nigel Cornwall was consecrated the first bishop of Borneo on 1 November 1949.

On returning to England in 1948, Hollis served as Vicar of Stanford with Swinford, Leicestershire; and as Assistant Bishop of Leicester and Senior Canon of Leicester from 1949; all until his death in February 1955.

== Selected publications ==
- "S.P.G.: an outline of the history of the mission in Sarawak" Sarawak Gazette 1000 (4 Jan 1937) supp. pp 15–16
- "The Church in Sarawak" Sarawak Gazette Centenary (20 Oct 1941) pp 15–16
- Hollis also translated parts of the Prayer Book and the Psalms into the Quop dialect, Land Dayak.
