= Rupert Mounsey =

British-Indonesian Anglican bishop (1867–1952)

William Robert Mounsey (called Robert until 1925 and Rupert thereafter; 1867–1952) was Bishop of Labuan and Sarawak from 1909 to 1916. In 1909 he founded the Borneo Mission Association.

William Robert (called Robert until 1925) was born on 20 September 1867, trained for the ministry at Lincoln Theological College and was made deacon on 21 September 1890, by William Maclagan, Bishop of Lichfield, at Lichfield Cathedral and later ordained priest. He began his ministry with curacies at St Stephen's, Willenhall and St James's, Wednesbury. Following this he was Organising Secretary of the New Guinea Mission before his elevation to the episcopate. After this he held incumbencies in Italy, Belgium and England before spending the final part of his life (1926 onwards) at the Community of the Resurrection, where he took the name Rupert.

In 1925 he was commissioned to assist the Bishop of Truro in the Diocese of Truro; in 1930 he was appointed Assistant Bishop of Truro. He was not in continuous residence, but as time went on his visits became more frequent and prolonged. He died on 18 June 1952.

Church of England titles
Preceded by George Hose	Bishop of Labuan and Sarawak; 1917–1931	Succeeded by Logie Danson
