= Bishop of Kuching =

- Bishopric

anglican
- Incumbent: Donald Alvin Jute Aheng

Location
- Country: Malaysia & Brunei Darusalam
- Ecclesiastical province: South East Asia
- Headquarters: Kuching City

Information
- First holder: Francis Thomas McDougall
- Denomination: Anglican
- Established: 1855, current establishment in 1962
- Diocese: Kuching
- Cathedral: St. Thomas' Cathedral
- Language: English, Bahasa malasya

The Bishop of Kuching is the ordinary of the Anglican Diocese of Kuching in the Church of the Province of South East Asia. The bishop exercises episcopal authority over Anglican churches in the Malaysian state of Sarawak and in the independent nation of Brunei Darussalam.

The see is in the city of Kuching where the seat of the bishop is located at the St. Thomas' Cathedral in Jalan McDougall, Kuching,

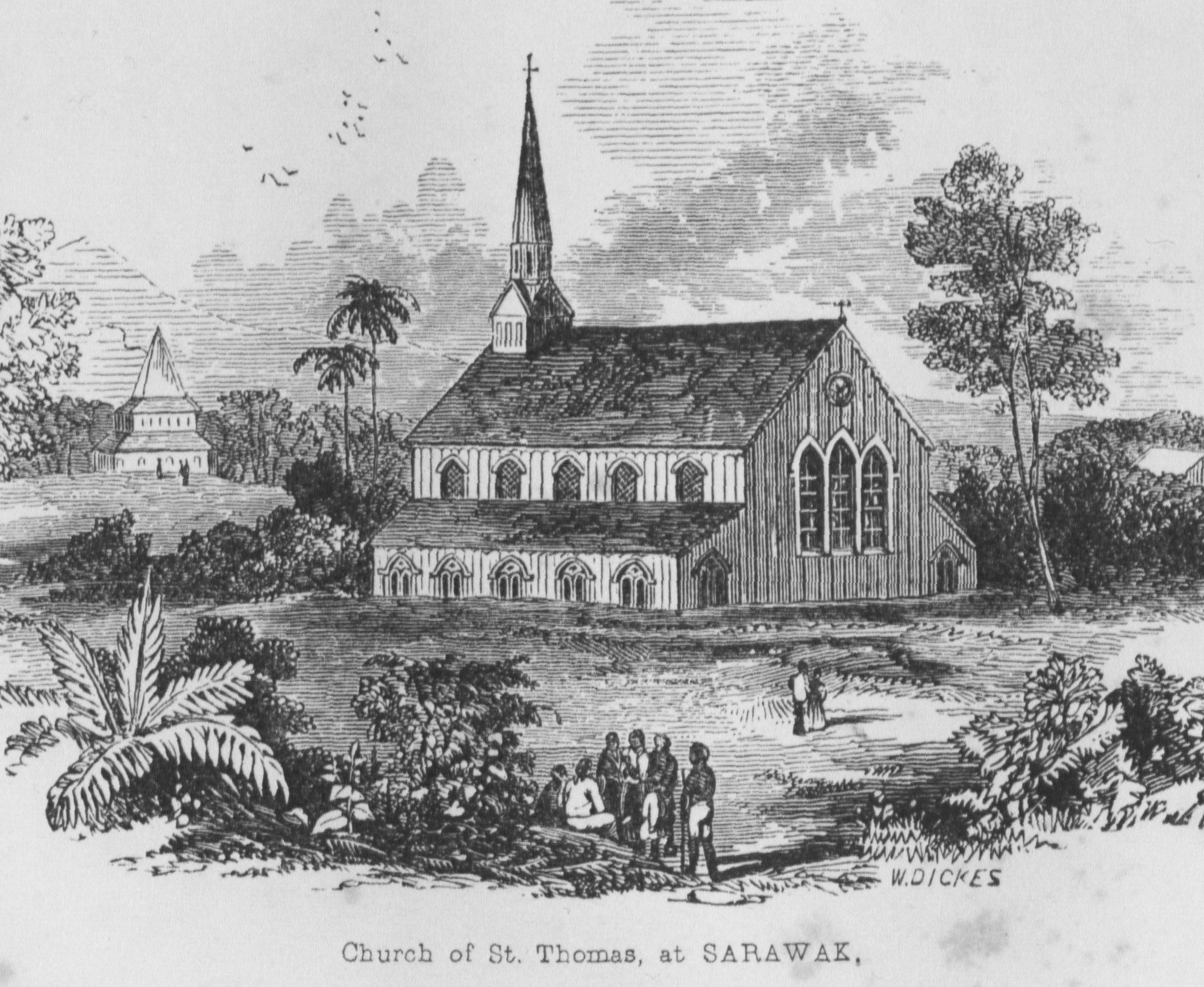
St. Thomas Cathedral - Kuching, Sarawak - 1851

originally built in 1848 and consecrated in 1851 as the home church and base for the Borneo Church Mission in Sarawak. The first Bishop of Kuching to be styled as such was appointed in 1962.

In 1968, Basil Temenggong was appointed the bishop of the diocese, becoming the first native Malaysian and Sarawakian to be appointed to the seat. The current bishop is Danald Jute who was appointed after the retirement of the former bishop, Bolly Lapok.

The bishop's residence is in The Bishop's House on a small hill in Kuching known as College Hill within the compound of the Cathedral. Initially constructed in 1849 as The Mission House and served as the first dispensary in Kuching.

== History ==
Anglican missions to the Kingdom of Sarawak began in 1848 under the auspices of the Borneo Church Mission. Episcopal authority of the mission was placed with the Diocese of Calcutta. Initiatives were made to create a separate diocese for the mission with the Society for the Propagation of the Gospel supporting the move and contributing a sum of £5,000 towards the endowment.

Unfortunately political conventions of the day did not allow for an Anglican diocese to be created outside territories administered directly by the British Crown and Sarawak was technically an independent kingdom under British protection. This difficulty was overcome when a letters patent was made in 1855 erecting the Diocese of Labuan and Sarawak based in the British Crown Colony of Labuan. This diocese covered a large geographical area including Sarawak, British North Borneo, and the Strait Settlements. In 1909, the Diocese of Singapore was separated from the diocese and the diocese reverted to the name Diocese of Labuan and Sarawak. In 1949, the diocese was again renamed as the Diocese of Borneo.

This arrangement continued until the 1962 division of the Diocese of Borneo into the Diocese of Kuching and the Diocese of Jesselton (renamed the Diocese of Sabah in 1968). James C. L. Wong, consecrated Assistant Bishop of Borneo in 1960, became diocesan bishop of Jesselton.

== List of bishops ==
Bishop of Labuan and Sarawak
| From | Until | Incumbent | Notes |
|---|---|---|---|
| 1856 | 1869 | Francis McDougall | |
Bishops of Labuan, Sarawak and Singapore
| From | Until | Incumbent | Notes |
| 1869 | 1881 | Walter Chambers | Churches in the Straits Settlements separated from the Diocese of Calcutta and placed under the Diocese of Labuan and Sarawak. Diocese renamed Diocese of Labuan, Sarawak and Singapore. |
| 1882 | 1908 | George Hose | |
Bishops of Labuan and Sarawak
| From | Until | Incumbent | Notes |
| 1909 | 1916 | Robert Mounsey | Churches in Singapore were separated from the Diocese to form its own Diocese of Singapore. The Diocese reverted to the name of Diocese of Labuan and Sarawak. |
| 1917 | 1931 | Logie Danson | Returned to England as Assistant Bishop of Carlisle; later Bishop of Edinburgh and Primus |
| 1932 | 1937 | Noel Hudson | |
| 1938 | 1948 | Francis Hollis | Returned to England as Assistant Bishop of Leicester |
Bishop of Borneo
| From | Until | Incumbent | Notes |
| 1948 | 1962 | Nigel Cornwall | The diocese was renamed the Diocese of Borneo and included Anglican missions in Kalimantan. |
Bishops of Kuching
| From | Until | Incumbent | Notes |
| 1963 | 1968 | Nicholas Allenby | The diocese was separated into the Diocese of Kuching and the Diocese of Jesselton (later renamed the Diocese of Sabah); David Howard Nicholas Allenby was consecrated bishop 30 November 1962 by Michael Ramsey, Archbishop of Canterbury, at Southwark Cathedral; later Assistant Bishop of Worcester |
| 1968 | 1984 | Basil Temenggong | The first native Malaysian and Sarawakian to be appointed as bishop. After Temenggong died suddenly, the former Assistant Bishop of Kuching, Peter Howes, returned to be the acting Bishop. |
| 1985 | 1995 | John Leong Chee Yun | |
| 1996 | 2007 | Made Katib | |
| 2007 | 2017 | Bolly Lapok | Archbishop of South East Asia, 2012–2016 |
| 2017 | present | Danald Jute | Current incumbent since 2017. |

== See also ==
- Diocese of Kuching
- Diocese of Sabah
- Anglican Diocese of Singapore
- Diocese of West Malaysia
- Church of the Province of South East Asia
