= Basil Temenggong =

Anglican bishop in Malaysia

Datuk Basil Temenggong (11 October 1918 – 22 September 1984) was a Malaysian clergyman in the Anglican Church. He was the second Bishop of Kuching from 1968 until his death in 1984, and the first indigenous Sarawakian bishop.

== Early life ==
Temenggong was born in 1918 at Pasa, an Iban longhouse a mile downriver from Betong, in what was then the Raj of Sarawak. He was educated at St Augustine's mission school in Betong and, after completing Standard 6, at St Thomas's School in Kuching. He returned to Betong, and for a short while he taught, before seeking ordination.

== Clerical career ==
In 1939 he went to Bishop's College, Calcutta, for training for ordination. He was ordained deacon in 1941 and priest in 1943. He was an assistant chaplain at St Thomas's, Calcutta (1941–43) and at Asansol (1943–46). In the latter post, he found himself ministering to allied soldiers massing at the border, waiting to fight the Japanese. In 1946 he returned to Sarawak to become headmaster of St Augustine's School, Betong until 1953. He then went to England to do a post-ordination course at St Augustine's College, Canterbury, followed by six months with the Community of the Resurrection at Mirfield, three months at All Saints Church, Poplar and a further three months at All Saints, Margaret Street. Subsequent appointments were as Priest-in-Charge of Saratok (1956–62) (and Canon of Borneo 1960–62) and Priest-in-Charge of St Luke's Mission, Simanggang (1962–68) (and Canon of Kuching 1962-68 and Archdeacon of Kuching 1965–68).

When Nicholas Allenby resigned as Bishop of Kuching in 1968, Temenggong was the unanimous choice to replace him.

He was President of the Council of Churches of Malaysia from 1972 to 1974 and the President of the Council of Churches of East Asia from 1979 until 1983.

== Personal life ==
He was made Datuk. He died during a confirmation service at Simunjan in 1984, aged 66.
