= Anglican dioceses of Burundi =

The Anglican dioceses of Burundi are the Anglican presence in Burundi; together they form the Province of the Anglican Church of Burundi. The Anglican churches of the area were under the authority of the Archbishop of Canterbury until 1965, when the Province of Uganda and Ruanda-Urundi (later of Uganda, Rwanda, Burundi, and Boga-Zaire) was created; Burundi was then part of the Province of Rwanda, Burundi, and Boga-Zaire from 1980 until its own church province was erected in 1992.

== Diocese of Buye ==
In 1951, Jim Brazier was consecrated a bishop, to serve as an assistant bishop in the Diocese of Uganda with delegated oversight for all of Ruanda-Urundi (a "suffragan area"); he was based in Ibuye (now in Burundi). When the Diocese of Ruanda-Urundi was erected (from Uganda diocese) in 1960, Brazier became her first diocesan bishop. Brazier retired in 1964 and was succeeded by Lawrence Barham, part of whose brief was to prepare the diocese for division: as part of this process, Yohana Nkunzumwami, Archdeacon of Northern Burundi, was appointed Assistant Bishop in Burundi and was the first Burundian consecrated a bishop. He became the first diocesan bishop of all Burundi when that diocese was erected in 1966; by the time of his death in post in 1978, his See was that of Buye.

=== Bishops of Buye ===
- 1966 – 1978 (d.): Yohana Nkunzumwami (initially as diocesan Bishop of Burundi)
- 1979 – 2005 (ret.): Samuel Ndayisenga (also Archbishop of Burundi, 1998–2005)
- October 2005 – present: Sixbert Macumi

== Diocese of Bujumbura ==
The second Burundian diocese, Bujumbura, was split from Buye in December 1975.

=== Bishops of Bujumbura ===
- 1975 – 1990 (trans.): Samuel Sindamuka (Primate from 1987; translated to Matana)
- 1990 – April 2013 (removed): Pie Ntukamazina (translated from Matana)
- 2013 – present: Eraste Bigirimana

== Diocese of Gitega ==
Gitega diocese was erected in 1985.

=== Bishops of Gitega ===
- 1985 – 2018 (ret.): John Nduwayo
- 2018 – present: Aimé Joseph Kimararungu (previously coadjutor bishop; consecrated August 2017)

== Diocese of Matana ==
The Diocese of Matana was founded from Bujumbura diocese on 26 August 1990.

=== Bishops of Matana ===
- 1990 (trans.): Pie Ntukamazina (translated to Bujumbura)
- 1990 – 1997 (ret.): Samuel Sindamuka (translated from Bujumbura; also Primate of Rwanda, Burundi and Boga-Zaire until 1992; also Archbishop of Burundi thereafter)
- 1997 – 2016 (ret.): Bernard Ntahoturi (also Archbishop of Burundi, 2005–2016)
- 2017 – present: Seth Ndayirukiye

== Diocese of Makamba ==
The Diocese of Makamba was erected in 1997.

=== Bishops of Makamba ===
- 1997 – present: Martin Nyaboho (also Archbishop of Burundi since 2016)

== Diocese of Muyinga ==
The Diocese of Muyinga was inaugurated on 5 November 2005.

=== Bishops of Muyinga ===
- 2005 – 2013: Eraste Bigirimana
- 2013 – present: Paisible Ndacayisaba

== Diocese of Rumonge ==
The seventh diocese, of Rumonge, was erected on 4 August 2013 from that of Bujumbura.

=== Bishops of Rumonge ===
- 2013 – present: Pedaculi Birakengana

== Diocese of Rutana ==
The Rutana diocese was founded from the Diocese of Matana in August 2017.

=== Bishops of Rutana ===
- 2017 – present: Pontien Ribakare

== Diocese of Buhiga ==
Most recently, the Diocese of Buhiga was erected from the Gitega diocese on 27 August 2017.

=== Bishops of Buhiga ===
- 2017 – present: Evariste Nijimbere

== See also ==
- List of Roman Catholic dioceses in Burundi
