= DCCU =

DCCU may refer to:

- Dane County Credit Union, a financial cooperative based in Madison, Wisconsin, United States
- Delta Community Credit Union, a savings and loans cooperative in Georgia, United States
- District of Canterbury Credit Union, a former savings and loans cooperative in the United Kingdom
- The reporting mark for containers from Dow Corning Corporation
- DC Extended Universe, or DC Cinematic Universe, a shared fictional universe of films and TV series developed by DC Studios
- Digital Camouflage Combat Uniform, standard camouflage pattern and combat uniform of Republic of China Armed Forces since 2013
