= Eraste Bigirimana =

Burundian Anglican bishop (born 1964)

The Most Reverend Eraste Bigirimana
- Primate of the Anglican Church of Burundi; Bishop of Bujumbura
- Church: Province of the Anglican Church of Burundi
- Diocese: Bujumbura
- In office: 2026–present (as primate)
- Predecessor: Sixbert Macumi
- Other post: Bishop of Bujumbura (2013–present)
- Previous post: Bishop of Muyinga (2005–2013)

Orders
- Consecration: 2005

Personal details
- Born: 1964 (age 61–62) Butezi, Ruyigi Province, Kingdom of Burundi
- Education: University of Burundi; Uganda Christian University

Eraste Bigirimana is a Burundian Anglican bishop. Since 2026, he has been primate and archbishop of the Anglican Church of Burundi. He was made bishop of Muyinga in 2005 and translated to the Diocese of Bujumbura in 2013.

== Early life and education ==
Bigirimana was born into an Anglican family in Butezi, Ruyigi Province, Burundi in 1964. He graduated from the University of Burundi in 1991 and became a teacher, first at a Roman Catholic seminary in Mugera and later at the high school in Musinzira, Burundi. In 1994, he received a vocation to ordained ministry and worked for the Diocese of Gitega as diocesan secretary. He received his theology degree from Uganda Christian University, then returned to Burundi in 1999 and became a priest in Gitega.

== Episcopal ministry ==
Bigirimana was elected bishop of Muyinga in November 2005. In 2011, he presided over the formation of the Diocese of Rumonge out of the Diocese of Muyinga's territory. He was translated in 2013 to the Diocese of Bujumbura, Burundi's largest city and then-capital, where the diocese had experienced distress, factionalism, financial difficulties and controversy over the actions of the prior bishop.

As a bishop, Bigirimana established a forum for the Christian universities and seminaries of Burundi to share resources. He also promoted peacemaking in the wake of the Burundian Civil War, which ended in 2005. He was appointed by the president of Burundi to serve on the nation's National Security Council, a senior advisory body that comprises leaders from politics, the military and civic life.

Bigirimana held several leadership roles in the Anglican Communion, serving as a delegate from Burundi to the Anglican Consultative Council at its 2012, 2016 and 2019 meetings. During the latter meeting, he endorsed traditional doctrine on human sexuality and said that the Anglican Communion instruments' failure to condemn homosexual practice was contributing to Anglicans in his region being drawn to the Global Fellowship of Confessing Anglicans, a group of Anglicans that was moving away from the Canterbury-led Anglican Communion. In 2025, Bigirimana became coordinator of the Anglican Communion's network for Francophone provinces.

Bigirimana was elected archbishop and primate of the Anglican Church of Burundi in May 2026. As primate, he also retained his see in Bujumbura. He was installed as primate on 23 August 2026 at Holy Trinity Cathedral in Bujumbura. Archbishop of Canterbury Sarah Mullally preached the sermon at his installation.
