= Martin Nyaboho =

Burundian Anglican archbishop (born 1955)

The Most Reverend Martin Nyaboho
- Primate of Burundi, Bishop of Makamba
- Church: Anglican Church of Burundi
- See: Bujumbura
- In office: 21 August 2016-21 August 2021
- Predecessor: Bernard Ntahoturi

Orders
- Ordination: 1973
- Consecration: 1997 by Samuel Sindamuka

Personal details
- Born: 1955 (age 70–71)

Martin Blaise Nyaboho (born 1955) is no longer a Burundian Anglican archbishop. He was elected the fourth archbishop and Primate of the Province of the Anglican Church of Burundi, and was installed on 21 August 2016 in Bujumbura's Holy Trinity Cathedral. He was succeeded by the Rt Rev Macumi Sixbert and was installed on the 21 August 2021.

== Early life and religious career ==
He was baptized in 1965 and confirmed in July 1969. He attended primary school at Rweza-Ryansoro Commune Gitega Province. He continued his studies at the Teachers college of Kibimba. He did his religious studies at Muweya Bible Institute and Matana Theological College. He attended afterwards Kenya Highlands Bible College, now called Kenya Highlands Evangelical University, in Kericho, and Asbury University College, in Wilmore, Kentucky, United States.

Nyaboho with his B.A. in Systematic Theology was a teacher at Matana Bible College, a Christian literature translator in Scripture Union, and a Bible translator at the Bible Society.

He was consecrated the first bishop of the Diocese of Makamba in 1997. He was the delegate of the Province of the Anglican Church of Burundi at the Anglican Consultative Council, from 2005 to 2009.

He was elected the fourth Archbishop and Primate of the Anglican Church of Burundi at the House of Bishops meeting held at 21 June 2016. Nyaboho was installed as archbishop on 21 August 2016 in Bujumbura's Holy Trinity Cathedral. At the occasion, the Bishop of Durham, the Rt Revd Paul Butler, preached the sermon.

He attended the 6th Global South meeting, in Cairo, Egypt, on 3-8 October 2016. In 2018 he led a march against gender violence through Makamba.

== Personal life ==
He is married to Emillienne and they have eight children, two boys, six girls and 4 grand children.

Anglican Communion titles
Preceded by Bernard Ntahoturi	Primate of the Anglican Church of Burundi; 2016–2021	Succeeded by Sixbert Macumi
