= Chair of St Augustine =

Medieval throne in Canterbury Cathedral

Coordinates: 51.27972°N 1.08306°E

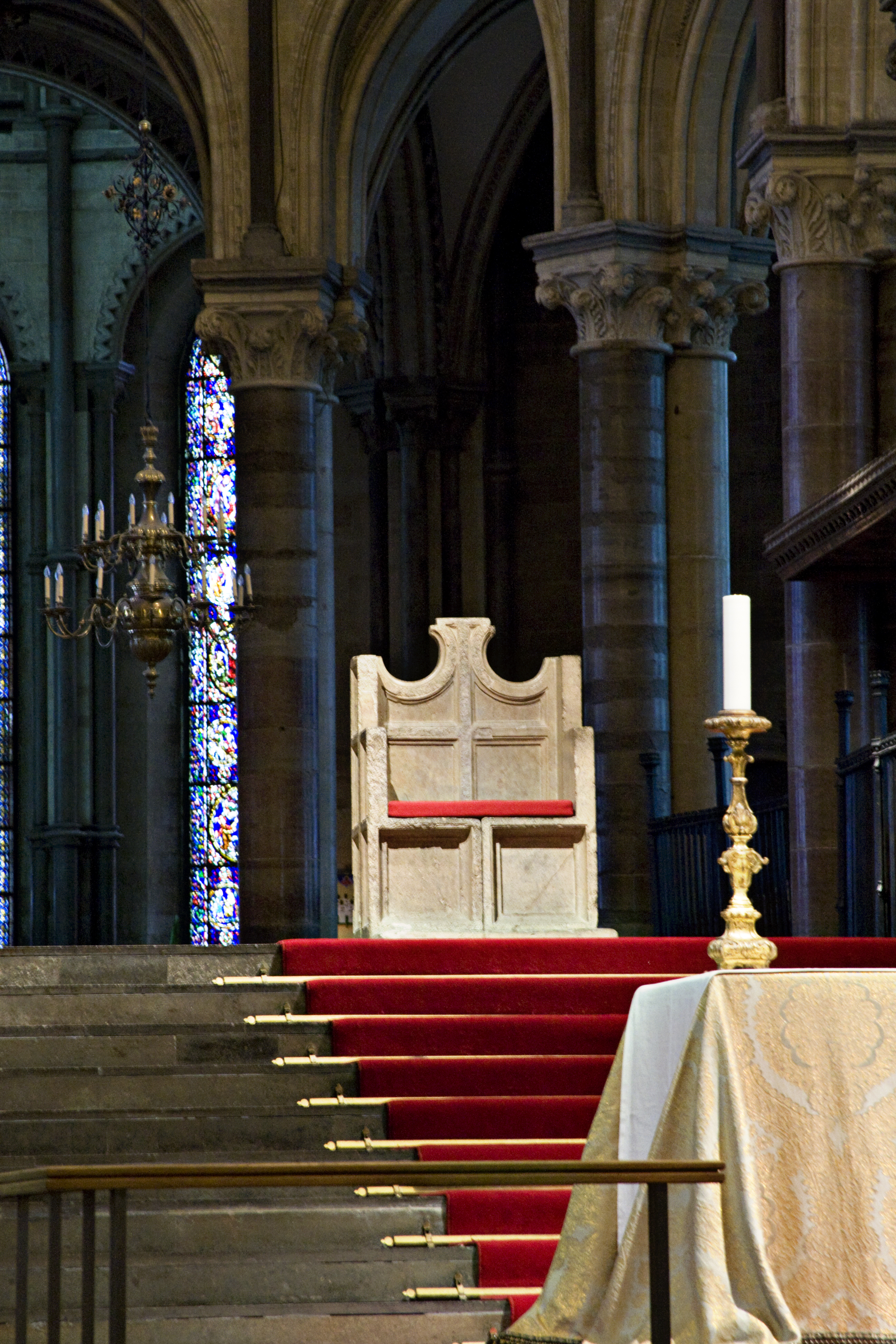
The Cathedra Augustini

The Chair of St Augustine or Cathedra Augustini (Latin) is the ceremonial enthronement cathedra of the archbishop of Canterbury in Canterbury Cathedral, Kent.

== History ==
The chair is made of Petworth marble and named after the first archbishop of Canterbury, St Augustine of Canterbury, though was made six centuries after Augustine's death. The current chair was produced between 1201 and 1204, as documented in the cathedral's accounts. It replaced an earlier chair that was destroyed by a fire in 1174. It has been speculated that the base of the current chair might contain fragments of the original chair. It was formerly located in the shrine of St Thomas Becket, which was destroyed during the English Reformation.

The previous chair is mentioned in the descriptions of the Anglo-Saxon and Romanesque cathedral buildings given by Eadmer and Gervase of Canterbury. Eadmer described "the pontifical chair, constructed with handsome workmanship and of large stones and cement"; it stood in the western apse behind the altar of St Mary but perished in the fire of 1067.

The current chair has been used for centuries in the triple enthronement of an archbishop of Canterbury. They are ceremonially seated on three thrones in different locations within the cathedral: in the choir to denote their role as diocesan bishop; in the chapter house as titular abbot of St Augustine's Abbey; and in St. Augustine's chair as Primate of All England.

The chair is only used during the enthronement ceremony and the (roughly decadal) Lambeth Conference. On all other occasions, the archbishop sits on the throne in the choir.

== Modern meaning ==
Given the worldwide nature of the modern Anglican Communion, the enthronement in St Augustine's Chair has come to represent also the archbishop of Canterbury's position as worldwide spiritual leader of the Communion; because of this it has become traditional following the enthronement in the Chair of St Augustine by the dean of Canterbury for the new archbishop to be blessed by the senior primatial archbishop (by length of service in office) from around the world; for example, Rowan Williams was blessed by the then archbishop of Armagh, Robin Eames, while Justin Welby was blessed by Archbishop of Burundi Bernard Ntahoturi, who gave his blessing in French.
