= Sixbert Macumi =

Burundian Anglican archbishop (born 1968)

The Most Reverend Sixbert Macumi
- Primate of Burundi; Bishop of Buye
- Church: Province of the Anglican Church of Burundi
- Diocese: Buye
- In office: 21 August 2021–23 August 2026
- Predecessor: Martin Nyaboho
- Successor: Eraste Bigirimana

Orders
- Ordination: 1996
- Consecration: 2005 by Samuel Sindamuka

Personal details
- Born: 1968 (age 57–58) Gakoni

Sixbert Macumi (born Gakoni, 1968) is a Burundian Anglican bishop. He is the bishop of Buye and was the primate and archbishop of the Province of the Anglican Church of Burundi from 2021 to 2026.

== Early life and ecclesiastical career ==
He was born in the province of Muyinga. He would be baptized in the Anglican faith in 1979 and confirmed in 1981. He decided to follow a religious life and he studied at the Theological Institute of Matana, from 1991 to 1994. He was ordained a deacon during this time. After finishing his studies, he returned to the Diocese of Buye, where he was a teacher at the Bishop Barham Theological College, in Buye. He was ordained a priest in 1996, and he was director and teacher at the Bishop Barham College. He was at the same time priest at Gatukuza parish and All Saints Cathedral, in Buye. He was diocesan secretary at Buye, from 1997 to 2000. He went back to his Theology studies in 2000, at Uganda Christian University, where he got a diploma. He returned to teach at Bishop Barham College afterwards.

He was consecrated bishop of Buye in 2005. He was elected on 24 May 2021 archbishop and primate of Burundi, and his consecration took place at the Holy Trinity Cathedral, in Bujumbura, on 21 August 2021. Macumi was succeeded as primate by Eraste Bigirimana in August 2026.

Anglican Communion titles
Preceded by Martin Nyaboho	Primate of the Anglican Church of Burundi; 2021–2026	Succeeded by Eraste Bigirimana
