= Diocese of Bujumbura =

Diocese of Bujumbura may refer to the following ecclesiastical jurisdictions:

- Roman Catholic Diocese of Bujumbura (1964–2006), Burundi, now the Roman Catholic Archdiocese of Bujumbura
- Anglican Diocese of Bujumbura (f. 1975), Burundi
