= Diocese of Muyinga =

Diocese of Muyinga may refer to the following ecclesiastical jurisdictions:

- Roman Catholic Diocese of Muyinga (f. 1968), Burundi
- Anglican Diocese of Muyinga (f. 2005), Burundi
