= Samuel Ndayisenga =

The Most Reverend Samuel Ndayisenga
- Primate of Burundi, Bishop of Buye
- Church: Anglican Church of Burundi
- See: Bujumbura
- In office: 1998 – July 2005

Orders
- Ordination: 1968
- Consecration: 1979

Personal details
- Born: 1935 Mugende, Burundi
- Died: 2008 (aged 72–73)

Samuel Ndayisenga (Mugende, 1935 – April 26, 2008) was the Primate of the Episcopal Church of Burundi. He was married to Joy Ndayisenga and they had six children, two of whom predeceased their parents.

He was baptized in his childhood, before entering primary school, which he attended from 1943 to 1949, in Buhiga, and in the final school year, in Matana. He studied at Kibimba Teacher Training School, from 1949 to 1954, becoming a primary school teacher afterwards, until 1963.

Ndayisenga decided to become a priest in 1963, studying Theology at the Theological Seminary in Buye, Burundi, from 1963 to 1965, and then at Bishop Tucker Theological College, in Mukono, Uganda, from 1965 to 1966. He moved to England, where he studied at the Trinity College, in Bristol, until 1968. He was finally ordained a Deacon at June 26, 1968, in Buye. After ordination, he was a teacher at the Theological College in Buye for the following years.

He was Bishop of the Diocese of Buye since 1979. He was consecrated the second Primate of the Episcopal Church of Burundi in 1998, holding office until his retirement on July 17, 2005. He was succeeded by the Most Rev. Bernard Ntahoturi.

Anglican Communion titles
Preceded by Samuel Sindamuka	Primate of the Episcopal Church of Burundi; 1998–2005	Succeeded by Bernard Ntahoturi
