= Bernard Ntahoturi =

Burundian Anglican bishop (born 1948)

The Most Reverend Bernard Ntahoturi
- Primate of Burundi, Bishop of Matana
- Church: Anglican Church of Burundi
- See: Bujumbura
- In office: July 2005-August 2016

Orders
- Ordination: 1973
- Consecration: 1997 by Samuel Sindamuka

Personal details
- Born: 1948 Matana, Burundi
- Died: 23 June 2025 (aged 76–77)

Bernard Ntahoturi (1948 in Matana - 23 June 2025) was a Burundian Anglican bishop. He was the Primate of the Anglican Church of Burundi from 2005 to 2016, and the Bishop of Matana.

== Education ==
Ntahoturi studied at Mukono Theological College, in Uganda, from 1968 to 1972. He then took his Diploma in Theology at the University of Cambridge; Ridley Hall and St. John's College, in 1976, and his M.A. in Diplomacy at Lincoln College, Oxford in 1982.

== Ordained ministry ==
Ntahoturi was ordained an Anglican priest in 1973. He served in the government of Burundi from 1979 to 1986, becoming chief of staff of President Jean-Baptiste Bagaza. After the overthrowing of President Bagaza in 1987, in a military coup, he was jailed from 1987 to 1991.

He was Provincial Secretary of the Episcopal Church of Burundi, being consecrated bishop of the Diocese of Matana in 1997. He was consecrated the third primate of the Anglican Church of Burundi on July 17, 2005. His mandate of five years was extended to another five at the reunion of the House of the Bishops of Burundi, on 23–24 June 2010, starting on July 17, 2010. He would serve until 21 August 2016.

He was also a member of the Central Committee of the World Council of Churches and chair of the Inter-Anglican Standing Commission for Unity, Faith, and Order. He was elected Chairman of the Council of the Anglican Provinces in Africa (CAPA) on February 7, 2012.

He was involved in the Anglican realignment as a member of the Global South. He attended GAFCON II, which took place in Nairobi, Kenya, from 21 to 26 October 2013. A moderate conservative, he was involved in several meetings with representatives from the pro-homosexuality provinces of the Anglican Communion, including the "Transformation Through Friendship" gathering, organized by the Episcopal Church of the United States, in October 2014. Five GAFCON Primates wrote to him in January 2015, criticizing his attitude, but Ntahoturi never replied. He would attend the Global South meeting, in Cairo, Egypt, in October 2015, being one of the 12 signings at the occasion, with several GAFCON Primates, including Foley Beach, from the Anglican Church in North America. After the Episcopal Church approval of same-sex marriage, Ntahoturi voted for their suspension from the Anglican Communion, in the Primates meeting held in January 2016.

He was appointed by Justin Welby to be the Representative of the Archbishop of Canterbury to the Holy See and Director of the Anglican Centre in Rome on 17 March 2017, taking office on 26 October. He was the first African and francophone to be appointed to both offices. He stepped down on 21 December 2018, having been accused of sexual misconduct.

He died on 23 June 2025.

Anglican Communion titles
| Preceded by Samuel Ndayisenga | Primate of the Anglican Church of Burundi; 2005–2016 | Succeeded by Martin Nyaboho |
| Preceded by David Moxon | Director of the Anglican Centre in Rome and Representative of the Archbishop of Canterbury to the Holy See; 2017–2018 | Succeeded by Ian Ernest |
