= Armorial of archbishops of Canterbury =

Wikimedia list article

Arms of the Diocese: Azure, an episcopal staff in pale Or, ensigned with a cross pattée, surmounted of a pall Argent with four crosses formy fitchy Sable edged and fringed Gold.

The Archbishop of Canterbury is the Primate of All England and the senior-most diocesan bishop in the Church of England.

Heraldry developed in the mid to late 12th century, so arms of archbishops before this are later attributions. Since the late 14th century it has been common practice for bishops to impale their personal arms with those of their see.

== Archbishops appointed by the Normans ==
Arms	Name of Archbishop and heraldic blazon
	Lanfranc, Archbishop 1070–1089 Escutcheon: Party per saltire Azure and Gules a cross bottony on a globe Or.
	Anselm, Archbishop 1093–1109 Escutcheon: Argent a cross Sable between twelve guttees du sang.
	Ralph d'Escures, Archbishop 1114–1122 Escutcheon: Sable a cross patriarchal Argent issuing from the base.
	William de Corbeil, Archbishop 1123–1136 Escutcheon: Azure a bend wavy in sinister chief a cross coupé Argent.
	Theobald of Bec, Archbishop 1138–1161 Escutcheon: Or two bars Azure a chief dancettée Gules

== Archbishops appointed by the Plantagenets ==
Arms	Name of Bishop and heraldic blazon
	Thomas Becket, Archbishop 1162–1170 Escutcheon: Argent three choughs two and one Sable beaked and legged Gules.
	Richard of Dover, Archbishop 1174–1184 Escutcheon: Azure between two bendlets three mullets Argent.
	Baldwin of Forde, Archbishop 1184–1190 Two contradictory blazons are recorded Escutcheon: Gules two bendlets and a bordure Argent. and Sable a cross humettée flory Gules over all a chevron Argent.
	Reginald Fitz Jocelin, Archbishop briefly in 1191 Escutcheon: Argent a fess dancettée a cross pattée issuing in chief Gules.
	Hubert Walter, Archbishop 1193–1205 Escutcheon: Quarterly Azure five mullets Argent and Argent an eagle displayed Sable over all cross Or.
	Stephen Langton, Archbishop 1207–1228 Two contradictory blazons are recorded Escutcheon: Party per pale Azure and Gules a bend Or. and Quarterly Gules and Or a bend Argent.
	Richard Weathershed, Archbishop 1229–1231 Escutcheon: Ermine on a bend Azure three pierced mullets Or.
	Edmund de Abbendon, Archbishop 1233–1240 Two contradictory blazons are recorded. Escutcheon: Gules a cross patonce Or between four sea-pies Sable winged Argent. and Azure on three suns Or three annulets Gules.
	Boniface of Savoy, Archbishop 1245–1270 Escutcheon: Gules a cross patonce Argent.
	Robert Kilwardby, Archbishop 1272–1278 Escutcheon: Azure on a bend Gules three escallops Or.
	John Peckham, Archbishop 1279–1292 Escutcheon: Ermine a chief quarterly Or and Gules.
	Robert Winchelsey, Archbishop 1294–1313 Escutcheon: Argent a fess Ermine voided Gules in chief three cinquefoils Vert.
	Walter Reynolds, Archbishop 1313-1327 Escutcheon: Azure, on a cross between the symbols of the Evangelists Or, five lions rampant Gules.
	Simon Mepeham, Archbishop 1328-1333 Escutcheon: Azure, three bendlets Or.
	John de Stratford, Archbishop 1333-1348 Escutcheon: Or, a fess gules between three torteaux. Alternatively, the field is Argent. Alternative arms: Per fess Gules and Sable, three plates; Another alternative: Gules, a fess humet between three tressels Argent.
	John de Ufford, Archbishop 1348-1349 Escutcheon: Sable, a cross engrailed Or.
	Thomas Bradwardine, Archbishop 1349 Escutcheon: Barry of six Ermine and Ermines.
	Simon Islip, Archbishop 1349-1366 Escutcheon: Gules, a cross formee Or. Alternatively, a cross moline.
	Cardinal Simon Langham OSB, Archbishop 1366-1368 Escutcheon: Or, a chevron embattled between three trefoils Gules. Alternatively, on his monument at Westminster: a cross pattee between three crowns, as Bishop of Ely.
	William Whittlesey, Archbishop 1368-1374 Escutcheon: Or, a saltier Azure.
	Simon Sudbury, Archbishop 1375-1381 Escutcheon: Azure, a talbot sejant and bordure engrailed Argent. Alternatively: Argent, on a cross Azure a letter M crowned Or.
	William Courtenay, Archbishop 1381-1396 Escutcheon: Or, three torteaux, on a label Azure three mitres Or.
	Thomas Arundel, Archbishop 1396-1397 & 1399-1414 Escutcheon: Gules, a lion rampant Or armed and langued Azure, quartering, Checky Or and Azure : all within a bordure engrailed Argent.
	Roger Walden, Archbishop 1397-1399 Escutcheon: Sable, two bars, in chief three cinquefoils argent. Alternatively, Argent, on a chevron gules, cotised azure, between six martlets gules three wings of the field.
	Henry Chichele, Archbishop 1414-1443 Escutcheon: Argent, a chevron between three cinquefoils (slipped) Gules.
	John Stafford, Archbishop 1443-1452 Escutcheon: Argent, on a chevron Gules a mitre Or, in a bordure engrailed Sable. Alternative versions include a mitre Argent, and both the field and mitre Or.
	Cardinal John Kemp, Archbishop 1452-1454 Escutcheon: Gules, three garbs in a bordure engrailed Or.
	Cardinal Thomas Bourchier, Archbishop 1454-1486 Escutcheon: Argent, a cross engrailed gules between four waterbougets sable, quartering, Gules, billetty Or, a fess Argent. Alternatively, with a mullet for difference on the first and fourth quarters; with a bordure Azure; with a mitre in chief.

== Archbishops appointed by the Tudors ==
Arms	Name of Bishop and heraldic blazon
	John Morton, Archbishop 1486–1500 Escutcheon: Quarterly Gules and Ermine 1st & 4th a goat's head erased Argent.
	Henry Deane, Archbishop 1501–1503 Escutcheon: Argent on a chevron Gules between three ravens three crosiers erect Or.
	William Warham, Archbishop 1503–1532 Escutcheon: Gules a fess Or in chief a goat's head erased in base three escallops Argent. Motto: Auxiulium Meum A Deo
	Thomas Cranmer, Archbishop 1533–1555 Escutcheon: Quarterly 1st & 4th Argent on a chevron Azure between three pelicans Sable three cinquefoils Or 2nd Gules six lions rampant in pile a bordure Or 3rd Argent five fusils in fess Gules each charge with an escallop Or. Motto: Nosce Teipsum Ad Deum
	Reginald Pole, Archbishop 1556–1558 Escutcheon: Quarterly of eight, 1st, Quarterly Azure three fleurs de lys or, and Gules three lions passant guardant in pale or, a label of three points azure, on each point a canton gules; 2nd, Per pale sable and or, a saltire engrailed counterchanged; 3rd Gules a saltire argent, a label compony argent and azure; 4th, Gules, a fess between six cross crosslets or; 5th, Chequy or and azure, a chevron ermine; 6th Argent, three lozenges in fess gules; 7th Or, a eagle displayed vert ... ; 8th Quarterly Or three chevronels gules, and Quarterted argent and gules, a fret or in the second and third quarters and a bend sable overall. Motto: Estote Prudentes Sicut Serpentes Et Innocentes Sicut Columbae Other variations of quarters are also seen.
	Matthew Parker, Archbishop 1559–1575 Escutcheon: Gules on a chevron between three keys Argent three estoiles of the field. Motto: Mundus Transit
	Edmund Grindal, Archbishop 1575–1583 Escutcheon: Quarterly Argent and Azure, a cross quarterly Ermine and Or between four doves counterchanged.
	John Whitgift, Archbishop 1583–1604 Escutcheon: Argent on a cross flory Sable five bezants. Crest: Out of a coronet Or a lion's gamb Gules holding a chaplet Vert. Motto: Vincit Qui Patitur Some sources blazon four bezants but most show five.

== Archbbishops appointed by the Stuarts ==
Arms	Name of Bishop and heraldic blazon
	Richard Bancroft, Archbishop 1604–1610 Escutcheon: Or on a bend between six crosslets Azure three garbs of the field. Motto: Volente Deo
	George Abbot, Archbishop 1611–1633 Escutcheon: Gules a chevron between three pears pendent Or. Motto: Clamamus Abba Pater
	William Laud, Archbishop 1633–1645 Escutcheon: Sable on a chevron between three estoiles Or three crosses patee fitchy Gules.
	William Juxon, Archbishop 1660–1663 Escutcheon: Or a cross Gules between four moors' heads affrontee couped at the shoulders and wreathed Gules. Crest: A moor's head affrontee with earrings and an Eastern crown Or.
	Gilbert Sheldon, Archbishop 1663–1677 Escutcheon: Argent on a chevron Gules three sheldrakes of the field on a canton Gules a rose Or.
	William Sancroft, Archbishop 1678–1691 Escutcheon: Argent on a chevron between three crosses patee Gules three doves of the field. Crest: On a wreath a snake Vert in its mouth a cross Gules.
	John Tillotson, Archbishop 1691–1694 Escutcheon: Azure a bend cotised between two garbs Or.
	Thomas Tenison, Archbishop 1695–1715 Escutcheon: Gules three leopards faces Or jessant-de-lys Azure surtout a bend engrailed Argent voided Azure.

== Archbishops appointed by the Hanoverians ==
Arms	Name of Bishop and heraldic blazon
	William Wake, Archbishop 1716–1737 Escutcheon: Or a trefoil Vert between two bars Gules in chief three torteaux.
	John Potter, Archbishop 1737–1747 Escutcheon: Sable a fess Ermine between three cinquefoils Argent.
	Thomas Herring, Archbishop 1747–1757 Escutcheon: Gules crusilly three herrings haurient Argent.
	Matthew Hutton, Archbishop 1757–1758 Escutcheon: Gules on a fess Or between three cushions lozengeways Ermine tasselled Or three fleurs-de-lys of the field.
	Thomas Secker, Archbishop 1758–1768 Escutcheon: Gules a bend engrailed between two bulls' heads couped Or.
	Frederick Cornwallis, Archbishop 1768–1783 Escutcheon: Sable guttee d'eau on a fess Argent three choughs.
	John Moore, Archbishop 1783–1805 Escutcheon: Argent on a chevron Sable between three moors' heads in profile habited Gules collared Vert two swords hilted Or.
	Charles Manners-Sutton, Archbishop 1805–1828 Escutcheon: Quarterly 1st & 4th Or a canton Sable 2nd & 3rd Or two bars Azure a chief quarterly Azure two fleurs-de-lys Or and Gules a lion passant guardant Or.
	William Howley, Archbishop 1828–1848 Escutcheon: Azure an eagle displayed Erminois on his breast a cross flory Gules.
	John Bird Sumner, Archbishop 1848–1862 Escutcheon: Ermine two chevrons Gules.
	Charles Longley, Archbishop 1862–1868 Escutcheon: Quarterly 1st & 4th quarterly per fess indented Or and Azure 2nd & 3rd Argent on a chevron Sable three bezants.
	Archibald Campbell Tait, Archbishop 1868–1882 Escutcheon: Quarterly 1st & 4th Argent a saltire and chief engrailed Gules 2nd & 3rd two ravens suspended by the neck from one arrow.
	Edward White Benson, Archbishop 1883–1896 Escutcheon: Argent between four bendlets Gules a quatrefoil between two trefoils slipped in bend Sable.
	Frederick Temple, Archbishop 1896–1902 Escutcheon: Quarterly 1st & 4th Or an eagle displayed sable (for Leofric, Earl of Mercia) 2nd & 3rd Argent two bars sable each charged with three martlets Or (Temple).

== Archbishops appointed by the Windsors ==
Alive
Incumbent

Arms	Name of Bishop and heraldic blazon
	Randall Davidson (later Baron Davidson of Lambeth), Archbishop 1903–1928 Escutcheon: Azure on a chevron Or between two estoiles in chief and a pheon in base Argent a fleur-de-lys Gules.
	Cosmo Gordon Lang (later Baron Lang of Lambeth), Archbishop 1928-42 Escutcheon: Quarterly per fess indented Argent and Sable in the first quarter an open book Proper leaved Gules in the last quarter two dock leaves Vert.
	William Temple, Archbishop 1942–1944 Escutcheon: Quarterly 1st & 4th Or an eagle displayed sable (for Leofric, Earl of Mercia) 2nd & 3rd Argent two bars sable, each charged with three martlets Or (Temple).
	Geoffrey Fisher (later Baron Fisher of Lambeth), Archbishop 1945–1961 Escutcheon: Argent a fess wavy between three fleur-de-lys Sable. Crest: A king's fisher Proper holding in the dexter claw a fleur-de-lys Sable.
	Michael Ramsey (later Baron Ramsey of Canterbury), Archbishop 1961–1974 Arms unknown.
	Donald Coggan (later Baron Coggan), Archbishop 1974–1980 Arms unknown.
	Robert Runcie (later Baron Runcie), Archbishop 1980–1991 Escutcheon: Argent on a fess Sable between three roses Gules barbed and seeded Proper as many crosses patonce also Argent; Crest: A horse statant Argent crined maned unguled and the tail Sable gorged with a chaplet of roses Gules barbed and seeded Proper resting the dexter foreleg upon a millrind Gold
	George Carey (later Baron Carey of Clifton), Archbishop 1991–2002 Arms unknown.
	Rowan Williams (later Baron Williams of Oystermouth), Archbishop 2002–2012 Escutcheon: Per pale Gules and Azure a chevron Ermine between three lions passant guardant armed within roundels Or all counterchanged. Motto: Cultus Dei Sapientia Hominis (The Worship of God is the Wisdom of Man)
	Justin Welby, Archbishop 2012–2024 Arms disputed.
	Sarah Mullally, Archbishop since 2026 Arms unknown.
