= Yohana Nkunzumwami =

First anglican bishop in Burundi

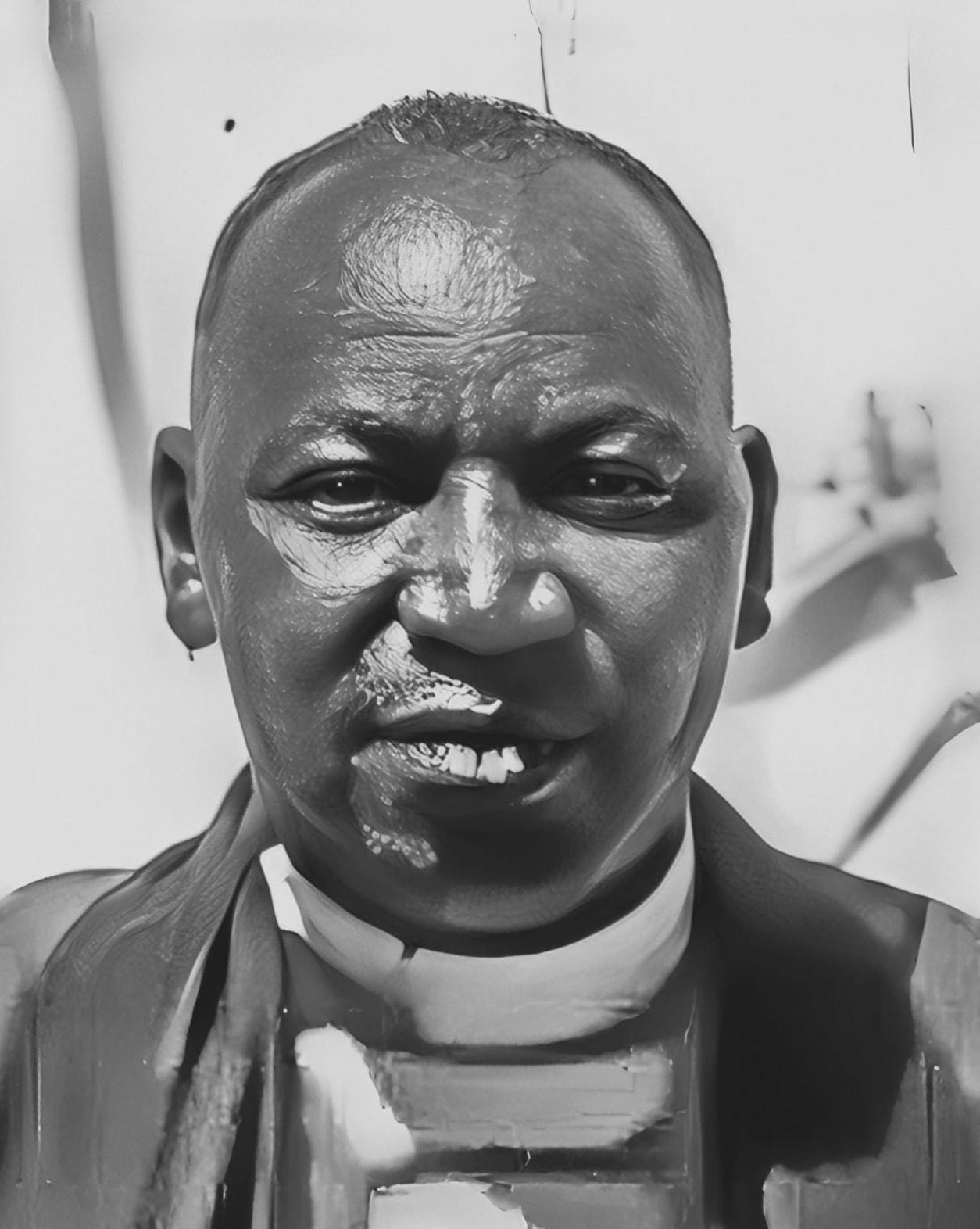

Personal life
- Spouse: Myriam Basabakwinshi

Religious life
- Religion: Anglican

Jean (Yohana in kirundi) Nkunzumwami was the first Anglican bishop in Burundi. He was married to Myriam Basabakwinshi and they had 12 children. Myriam was the director of Mother’s Union till her death in June 2001.

In Kirundi, Nkunzumwami means “I love the king” (nkunzu = I cling to, I love; mwami = the king). This name was given to him after the Burundian king Mwambutsa IV offered land to his father, Rugobe.

Nkunzumwami was educated at Warner Memorial Theological College, Ibuye, Burundi and ordained deacon in 1956 and priest in 1957. He served the church in Uganda, Rwanda and Burundi. He was consecrated the first Bishop of Burundi in 1965.
