= Kenya Highlands University =

University in Kenya

Coordinates: 0°22′10″S 35°16′03″E

- Former names: Kenya Highlands Evangelical University
- Established: 1970; 56 years ago
- Vice-Chancellor: Prof. Wilson Lang'at
- Students: 1000 (2019)
- Location: Kericho, Kenya
- Website: http://www.khu.ac.ke/

Kenya Highlands University (formerly Kenya Highlands Evangelical University)is fully-fledged (Chartered) private institution of higher learning. It is located in Kericho in Kenya.

== History ==
The ideological heritage of educational instruction at the Kenya Highlands Bible College, which became the university recently, dates back to 1932 when missionaries of World Gospel Mission saw the need for training their converts. This instruction not only needed to cover biblical and ministry-related subjects, but also teacher training. Teachers were prepared for the sixteen primary schools the mission had started. These first teachers also served as preachers in their communities. A school first started in 1936 in the Sotik area as a Teacher's Bible School and met in various locations.

In 1944, the school was officially opened as Sotik Bible School and courses continued to combine training techniques in primary school teaching and Bible. The following year, the Bible School students were separated from the teacher training group as the need for trained leadership for the church grew. In 1950 the school was relocated from Sotik to Cheptenye in Belgut area.

Due to the need for more space to develop classrooms, dormitories, library and chapel facilities and staff housing, another plot was sought which would be separate from the established mission stations. The present site was acquired in 1953, and in 1955 Kenya Highlands Bible School was begun, offering a two-year Bible programme leading to the Christian Workers Certificate. In 1957 the course was upgraded to include a three-year programme leading to a diploma in Bible.

In 1962, the level of admission and training was again elevated to provide training on a secondary level in both biblical and secular subjects, and the name was changed to Kenya Highlands Bible College. In 1967 the college started offering secondary school education up to 1973 when it ceased offering “O” level. In 1970 the Bible College Council was constituted, drawing its membership equally from the church and the mission, and charged with the responsibility of managing the institution and improving the academic standards. In 1971 the college admitted its first class of post-secondary students into a four-year curriculum, modeled after degree-granting Bible colleges in North America, leading to the degree of Bachelor of Religion in Biblical Studies.
