= District of Canterbury Credit Union =

Credit union in the United Kingdom (2005–2011)

- Founded: 2005
- Dissolved: 2011 (transfer of engagements)
- Type: Industrial and Provident Society
- Location: 37 St Margaret's Street, Canterbury, Kent CT1 2TU

The District of Canterbury Credit Union Limited was a savings and loans co-operative based in the cathedral city of Canterbury. In 2011, it merged with the larger Kent Savers Credit Union.

== History ==
Founded in 2005, the District of Canterbury Credit Union had branches in Canterbury, Herne Bay and Whitstable. Membership was restricted by common bond to residents and workers in the Canterbury local authority area. In its first year of trading, the credit union attracted £94,000 of savings and made £31,000 of loans.

In 2011 members voted to transfer engagements to Kent Savers Credit Union. Kent Savers was set up in 2010 to provide affordable financial services to the people of the historic county of Kent, the area currently administered by Kent County Council, the Borough of Medway (both parts of the ceremonial county) and the London Borough of Bexley.

== Activities ==
The objectives of the District of Canterbury Credit Union were to provide its members with free financial education, offer low-rate loans and encourage thrift. In 2008 the Lord Williams of Oystermouth, 104th Archbishop of Canterbury and a member of the District of Canterbury Credit Union, spoke of the merits of the credit union movement in the House of Lords.

A member of the Association of British Credit Unions Limited, registered under the Industrial and Provident Societies Acts, the District of Canterbury Credit Union was authorised and regulated by the Financial Services Authority. Ultimately, like the banks and building societies, members’ savings were protected against business failure by the Financial Services Compensation Scheme. The credit union limited loans to £4,000 and would only lend where it appeared that the member would be able to service the loan.

== See also ==
- Credit unions in the United Kingdom
- British co-operative movement
