= Delta Community Credit Union =

Savings and loans co-operative

- Company type: Credit union
- Industry: Banking, financial services
- Founded: 1940; 86 years ago
- Headquarters: Atlanta, Georgia U.S.
- Area served: Barrow, Butts, Cobb, Cherokee, Clayton, Coweta, DeKalb, Douglas, Fulton, Fayette, Forsyth, Gwinnett, Henry, Hall, Jackson, Newton, Paulding, Rockdale, Spalding, Walton
- Key people: Hank Halter (CEO & president); Matthew Shepherd (COO); Abdul Hussain (Chief Risk Officer); Jay Gratwick (CFO); Tim Mitchell (CIO); Robert Walsh (Chief Lending Officer); Robert Manning (General Counsel)
- Services: Checking Account; Savings Account; Credit Card; CD Account; Money Market Account; New Car Loan; Used Car Loan; Home Loan; Retirement Planning; Mobile Banking; Online Banking; Insurance
- Number of employees: 1,400+
- Website: deltacommunitycu.com

Delta Community Credit Union is an American credit union headquartered in Atlanta, Georgia, United States. Delta Community Credit Union has over $8.9B in assets and more than 525,000 members. Delta Community has been ranked among the top 40 largest credit unions in the U.S. Members include residents in 20 Atlanta metro area counties. The credit union serves the following companies: Delta Air Lines, Chick-fil-A, RaceTrac and UPS. As a not-for-profit credit union, their earnings must be returned to their members. According to Credit Unions Online, "the largest credit union in Georgia is Delta Community Credit Union...".

Delta Community is a state-chartered credit union organized under the Georgia Department of Banking and Finance and federally insured by the National Credit Union Share Insurance Fund. It has 34 branch offices in four states--31 in metro Atlanta and one each in Cincinnati/Northern Kentucky, Dallas and Salt Lake City. There are 72 Delta Community-owned ATMs, including 44 with an interactive teller feature, and it is a member of CO-OP, a nationwide cooperative that offers access to 33,000 surcharge-free ATMs in the United States, including more than 8,000 deposit-taking locations.

== History ==
In February 1940, Delta Employees Credit Union was formed in Atlanta, Georgia, by eight Delta Air Lines employees, each with a stake of $45 in share capital. On March 8, 1940, Delta Employees Credit Union received a charter entitling it to 20 years of operation. One month later, the first board of directors was composed. The board voted that membership was open to all Delta employees. By the end of 1940 assets were approximately $2,000.

In 1960, the board granted a renewal of the credit union's charter. By 1983, assets were +$200M. Delta Employees Credit Union was then and is now the largest credit union in Georgia.

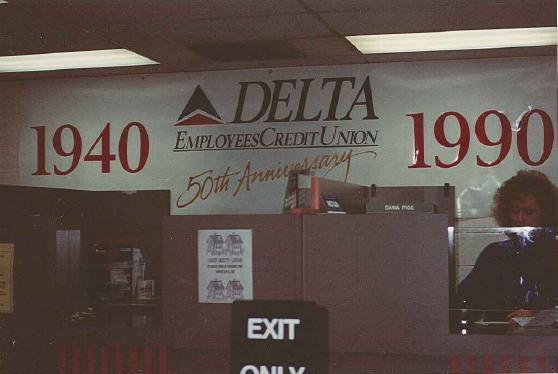
Historical photo marking the 50th Anniversary of Delta Community Credit Union on March 8, 1990

On March 8, 1990, Delta Employees Credit Union held its 50th anniversary.

In July 1994, the credit union implemented a policy of "Once a member, always a member," thus eliminating the stipulation that an individual had to be an active Delta employee to be a member. Membership was also extended to the parents of active and former Delta employees in good standing. In 1995 the Delta Employees Credit Union's total number of members exceeded the 100,000 mark. Membership privileges were offered to children, grandparents, grandchildren, brothers and sisters of the member and their spouses. In 2001, domestic partners of members were added.

In October 2005, Delta Employees Credit Union changed their name to Delta Community Credit Union to reflect that Delta Community membership was--and still is--now open to anyone who lives or works in the Georgia counties where Delta Community Credit Union operates, along with current, former or retired employees of various companies throughout the U.S. may also join. Membership eligibility is no longer limited only to people who had a formal relationship with Delta Air Lines (or with a family member who had a Delta Air Lines relationship).

In 2010, Delta Community offered Mobile Banking as an option to members.

In 2013, Hank Halter was appointed President and CEO of Delta Community Credit Union and named an Atlanta top 100 leaders in finance by the Atlanta Business Chronicle.

In April 2025, Delta Community opened its 33rd branch. In March 2024, Delta Community achieved membership of more than 500,000.

== Membership ==
Membership is open to anyone who lives or works in the Georgia counties of Barrow, Butts, Cherokee, Clayton, Cobb, Coweta, DeKalb, Douglas, Fayette, Forsyth, Fulton, Gwinnett, Hall, Henry, Jackson, Newton, Paulding, Rockdale, Spalding and Walton. Current, former or retired employees of various companies throughout the U.S. may also join.

== Branch locations ==
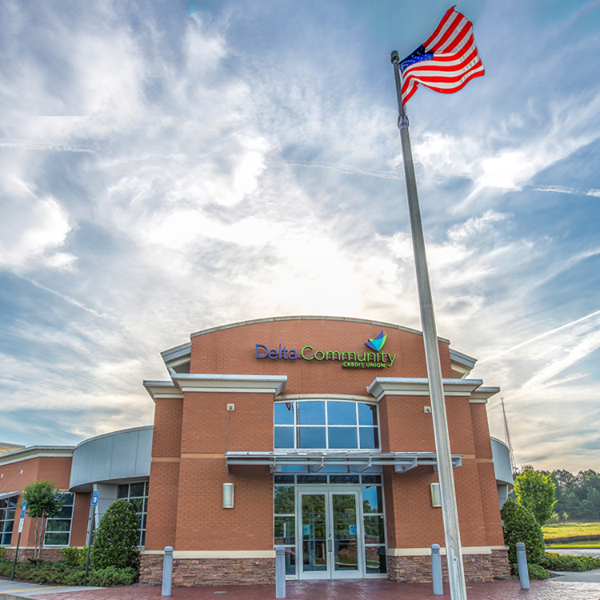
Delta Community Credit Union Branch

Delta Community Credit Union has branch locations in the states of Georgia, Kentucky, Texas and Utah. Delta Community Credit Union branch locations include: Alpharetta, Atlanta, Buford, Canton, Cumming, Decatur, Douglasville, Duluth, Fayetteville, Gainesville, Johns Creek, Locust Grove, Marietta, McDonough, Newnan, Peachtree City, Sandy Springs, Snellville, and Stockbridge. City locations outside of Georgia include: Florence, Kentucky; Southlake, Texas and Salt Lake City, Utah.

Delta Community Credit Union expanded its administrative offices in November 2017. The administrative office is located at 3250 Riverwood Parkway, Atlanta, Georgia, 30339.

== Services ==
Delta Community Credit Union offers personal banking services, small business, and commercial banking services such as checking accounts, savings accounts, health savings accounts, credit card accounts, online banking, online bill pay, new car loans, used car loans, student loans, personal loans, vacation loans, RV loans, boat loans, home equity loans, home mortgages and consumer loans. Commercial banking and services offered are: commercial real estate lending, SBA 504, equipment and vehicle financing, and lines of credit. The credit union also provides investment services, financial planning services and insurance through subsidiaries.

== See also ==
- Wings Credit Union – another credit union serving the Atlanta area that has origins with Northwest Airlines employees
