= Province of the Anglican Church of Burundi =

Anglican Church of Burundi

- Classification: Protestant
- Orientation: Anglican
- Scripture: Holy Bible
- Theology: Anglican doctrine
- Polity: Episcopal
- Primate: Eraste Bigirimana
- Headquarters: Bujumbura
- Territory: Burundi
- Members: 1,276,000 (2020)
- Official website: Province of the Anglican Church of Burundi Official Website

The Province of the Anglican Church of Burundi (French: Province de l'Église anglicane du Burundi) is a province of the Anglican Communion, located in East Africa between Tanzania, Rwanda, Kenya, and the Congo. The Archbishop and Primate of Burundi is Eraste Bigirimana. According to the World Christian Database and the World Christian Encyclopedia, published by Edinburg University Press, the church claims to have 1,276,000 baptised members.

== Name ==
The name of the Province of the Episcopal Church of Burundi changed to the Province of the Anglican Church of Burundi (Province de l'Église Anglicane du Burundi) as the result of a decision taken at the Provincial Synod held in Bujumbura, March 2005.

== History ==
After the first missionary work, the first Anglican structures in Burundi were established around 1935 and grew rapidly. The former Ruanda Mission set up its first mission stations at Buhiga and Matana in 1935, and Buye in 1936. There was much growth through medical work and education. Metropolitical authority came from the Archbishop of Canterbury until in 1965 the Province of Uganda, Rwanda, Burundi, and Boga-Zaire was established, and the first national bishop was consecrated for the Diocese of Buye (covering the whole country).

Following expansion, Uganda became an independent province, leaving the rest of the region as the new Province of Rwanda, Burundi, and Boga-Zaire. In 1975, Buye diocese was divided into two and the Diocese of Bujumbura was created. The Diocese of Gitega came into existence in 1985, followed by the Diocese of Matana in 1990. The most recent diocese to be created was the Diocese of Rumonge, created from the southern part of the Diocese of Bujumbura and comprising around 50 parishes. Their first bishop elected was Pedaculi Birakengana, with the official inauguration of the diocese taking place on 4 August 2013.

In 1992, the three countries of the Province each gained independence under their own individual Metropolitan Archbishop. The Episcopal Church of Burundi had his first Primate in Samuel Sindamuka, who would be in office until 1998. He was followed by Samuel Ndayisenga, Primate from 1998 to 2005. In Burundi expansion continued, with Makamba diocese established in 1997 and Muyinga in 2005. In 2005, the Province adopted the current name. Archbishop Bernard Ntahoturi was elected Primate the same year and reelected in 2010. On May 21, 2026, Eraste Bigirimana, Bishop of Bujumbura, was elected the Province of the Anglican Church in Burundi’s sixth archbishop and primate.

== Membership ==
There were approximately 1,000,000 Anglicans in an estimated population of 14 million in Burundi. The church claims 1,276,000 baptised members.

== Structure ==
The polity of the Anglican Church of Burundi is Episcopal church governance, which is the same as other Anglican churches. The church maintains a system of geographical parishes organized into dioceses. The spiritual head of the province is its Archbishop, who is Ordinary of one of the dioceses, Metropolitan of the Province, and Primate. There are currently nine dioceses, each headed by a bishop.

== Archbishop of Burundi ==
The Archbishop of Burundi is both Metropolitan and Primate; he retains his diocesan See along with the Primacy. The holders of the office have been:

- Samuel Sindamuka (1992–1998)
- Samuel Ndayisenga (1998–2005)
- Bernard Ntahoturi (2005–2016)
- Martin Nyaboho (2016–2021)
- Sixbert Macumi (2021–2026)
- Eraste Bigirimana (since 2026)

== Worship and liturgy ==
The Anglican Church of Burundi embraces three orders of ministry: deacon, priest, and bishop. A local variant of the Book of Common Prayer is used.

== Doctrine and practice ==
The center of the Anglican Church of Burundi's teaching is the life and resurrection of Jesus Christ. The basic teachings of the church, or catechism, includes:

- Jesus Christ is fully human and fully God. He died and was resurrected from the dead.
- Jesus provides the way of eternal life for those who believe.
- The Old and New Testaments of the Bible were written by people "under the inspiration of the Holy Spirit". The Apocrypha are additional books that are used in Christian worship, but not for the formation of doctrine.
- The two great and necessary sacraments are Holy Baptism and Holy Eucharist
- Other sacramental rites are confirmation, ordination, marriage, reconciliation of a penitent, and unction.
- Belief in heaven, hell, and Jesus's return in glory.

The threefold sources of authority in Anglicanism are scripture, tradition, and reason. These three sources uphold and critique each other in a dynamic way. This balance of scripture, tradition and reason is traced to the work of Richard Hooker, a sixteenth-century apologist. In Hooker's model, scripture is the primary means of arriving at doctrine and things stated plainly in scripture are accepted as true. Issues that are ambiguous are determined by tradition, which is checked by reason (on how scripture, tradition, and reason work to "uphold and critique each other in a dynamic way").

The Church of Burundi ordains women as deacons and priests.

=== Social issues ===
The Church's major concerns include peace and reconciliation, repatriation of refugees and displaced people, community development, literacy and education, and fighting AIDS. It is committed to mission and evangelism and is concerned to support theological education and training for ministry.

=== Ecumenical relations ===
Unlike other Anglican churches, the Anglican Church of Burundi is not a member of many ecumenical bodies. The Church is not a member of the World Council of Churches.

== Anglican realignment ==
The Anglican Church of Burundi is a member of the Global South but has not been active in Anglican realignment. Archbishop Bernard Ntahoturi attended GAFCON II, that took place in Nairobi, Kenya, from 21 to 26 October 2013. The province was represented at GAFCON III, held in Jerusalem, on 17-22 June 2018, by a single delegate. The leading name of the GAFCON in the province is Bishop Seth Ndayirukye, of the Diocese of Matana. Four bishops of the Anglican Church of Burundi attended the GAFCON Training Bishops Institute in May 2019.

The House of Bishops commended a statement by Rowan Williams, a former Archbishop of Canterbury, in 2006 with a commitment to remaining part of the Anglican Communion. In 2023, the Province reaffirmed its commitment to the Anglican Communion and denied "rumours" that the church was going to align with GAFCON. Archbishop Macumi also stated his province theological orthodoxy on human sexuality, and that it will “always remain a member of the Anglican Communion and well committed to observing the biblical truth and Christ centred teachings and messages that are proclaimed to the world as it is recommended in Matthew 28.16-20 and as long as the 1/10 Resolution is observed”.
