= Samuel Sindamuka =

The Most Reverend Samuel Sindamuka
- Primate of Burundi
- Church: Anglican Church of Burundi
- Archdiocese: Burundi
- Diocese: Matana
- See: Matana
- In office: 1992-1998
- Successor: Archbishop Samuel Ndayisenga
- Previous posts: Archbishop of the Province of Burundi, Rwanda and Boga-Zaire (1987-1998)

Orders
- Ordination: 1974
- Consecration: 1975

Personal details
- Born: 1928 Gitara, Burundi
- Died: 2005 (aged 76–77) Bujumbura, Burundi

Samuel Sindamuka (Gitara, Province of Bururi, 1928 - December 18, 2005) was the first Primate of the Anglican Church of Burundi, then called the Episcopal Church of Burundi, entitled in French Église Episcopale du Burundi.

Sindamuka's parents were among the first converts to Anglicanism in his region and he was baptized in 1939. He studied to become a primary school teacher, working at first in Matana. He later became the headteacher in Matana and then Buhiga and subsequently inspector of all primary schools in the Matana area. He married Flavia Kayeye and they had seven children.

Later he became the legal representative for church schools of the Protestant Churches Alliance, now called National Council of Churches. He was also a member of the parliament of Burundi for four years, in the first years of the country's independence.

He was ordained as an Anglican priest in 1974 and consecrated a bishop in 1975, to serve as diocesan Bishop of Bujumbura, the new second diocese in Burundi. In 1987 he became Archbishop of the Province of Burundi, Rwanda and Boga-Zaire, until it was separated into its constituent countries in 1992. He then became the first Archbishop of the newly created Province of the Episcopal Church of Burundi, from 1992 until his retirement in 1998. Meanwhile in 1990 he had become Bishop of Matana, swapping dioceses with Pie Ntukamazina, who became Bishop of Bjumbura.

His funeral and burial took place in St. Peter's Cathedral, in Matana, the Anglican Diocesan Centre in Bururi Province. The tributes given at the time of his death demonstrated how widely his faith and integrity were respected by both Burundi nationals and expatriates and by church members and political leaders.

Anglican Communion titles
Preceded by new title	Primate of the Episcopal Church of Burundi; 1992–1998	Succeeded by Samuel Ndayisenga
