= Archbishop of Canterbury =

Principal leader of the Church of England

- Archbishopric

Anglican
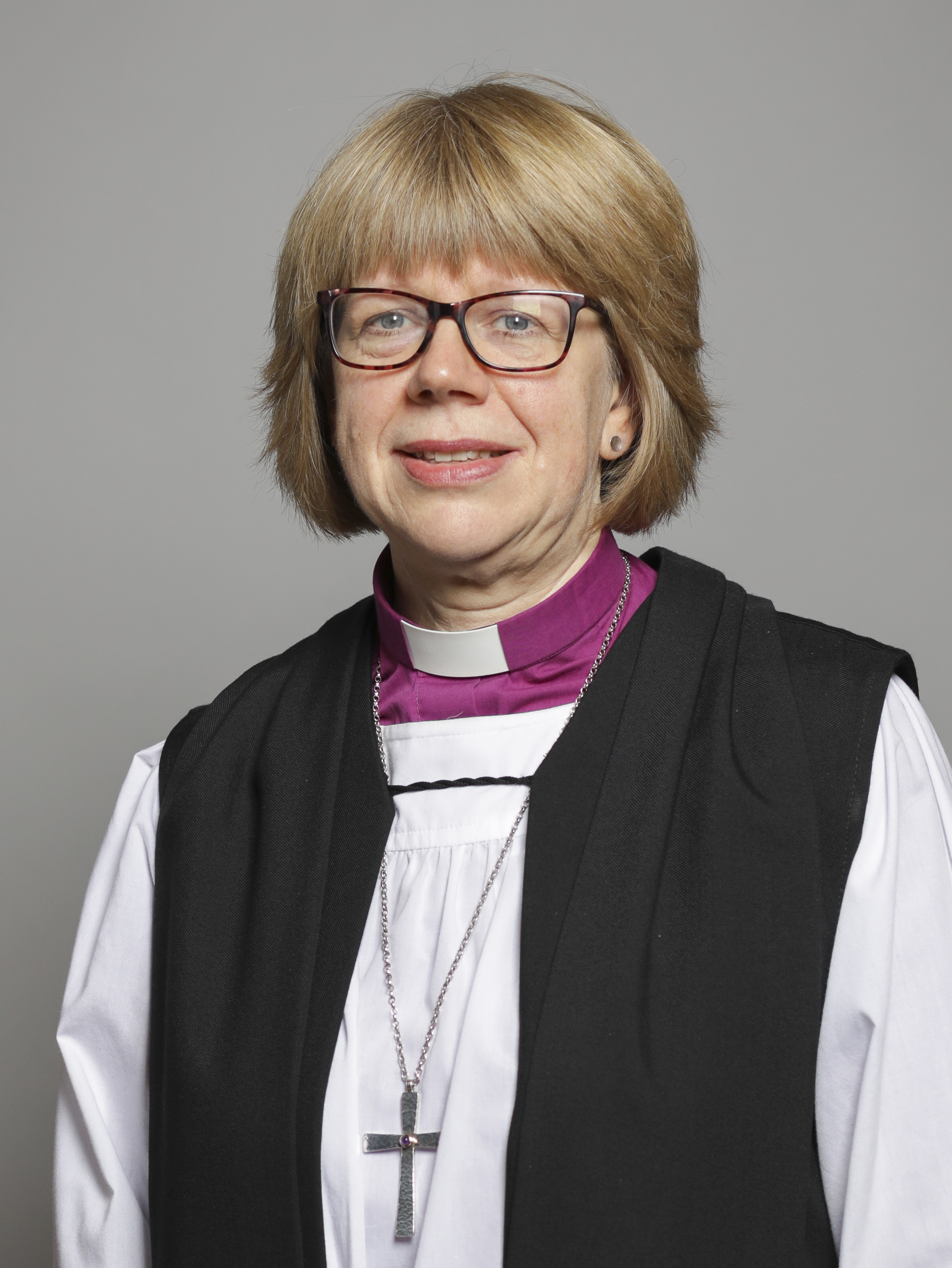
- Mullally in 2019, while Bishop of London

- Arms of the diocese of Canterbury: Azure, an episcopal staff in pale or surmounted by a pall proper edged and fringed of the second charged with four crosses pattée fitchée sable
- Incumbent; Sarah Mullally since 28 January 2026
- Style: The Most Reverend and Right Honourable (otherwise Her Grace)

Location
- Ecclesiastical province: Canterbury
- Residence: Lambeth Palace; Old Palace

Information
- First holder: Augustine of Canterbury
- Denomination: Anglican; Former: Catholic
- Established: 597
- Diocese: Canterbury
- Cathedral: Canterbury Cathedral

Website
- archbishopofcanterbury.org

The Archbishop of Canterbury is the senior bishop and primate of the Church of England. In this capacity, they are the diocesan bishop of the diocese of Canterbury, the metropolitan of the province of Canterbury, and the ceremonial head of the worldwide Anglican Communion. Ecclesial functions aside, the archbishop is also one of the 26 Anglican bishops who sit in the House of Lords as a Lord Spiritual. The 106th archbishop is Dame Sarah Mullally, who was confirmed on 28 January 2026 and is the first woman to hold the office.

The first archbishop of Canterbury was Augustine, the "Apostle to the English", who was sent to England by Pope Gregory the Great and arrived in 597. From Augustine until William Warham the archbishops of Canterbury were in full communion with the Catholic Church. During the English Reformation, King Henry VIII broke communion with Rome and proclaimed himself the head of the Church of England. Thomas Cranmer, appointed in 1533, initially with Rome's approval, thereafter became the first Protestant archbishop of Canterbury and would become one of the most important figures in the development of Anglicanism.

The archbishop is appointed by the British monarch on the advice of the prime minister of the United Kingdom and formally elected by the college of canons of Canterbury Cathedral. In practice, however, candidates are chosen by the Crown Nominations Commission, a Church of England body which advises the prime minister.

== Present roles and status ==
Currently, the archbishop fills four main roles:

- Bishop of the diocese of Canterbury, which covers the eastern parts of the County of Kent. Founded in 597, it is the oldest see in the English church.
- Metropolitan archbishop of the province of Canterbury, which covers the southern two-thirds of England.
- The senior primate and chief religious figure of the Church of England (the British sovereign is the supreme governor of the church). Along with their colleague the archbishop of York they chair the General Synod, and sit on or chair many of the church's important boards and committees; power in the church is not highly centralised, however, so the two archbishops can often lead only through persuasion. The archbishop of Canterbury plays a central part in national ceremonies such as coronations; due to their high public profile, their opinions are often in demand by the news media.
- Spiritual leader of the Anglican Communion. The archbishop, although without legal authority outside England, is recognised by convention as primus inter pares ("first among equals") of all Anglican primates worldwide. Since 1867 the archbishop has convened approximately decennial meetings of worldwide Anglican bishops, the Lambeth Conferences.

In the last two of these functions, they have an important ecumenical and interfaith role, speaking on behalf of Anglicans in England and worldwide.

The archbishop's main residence is Lambeth Palace in the London Borough of Lambeth. They also have lodgings in the Old Palace, Canterbury, located beside Canterbury Cathedral, where the Chair of St Augustine sits.

As holder of one of the "five great sees" (the others being York, London, Durham and Winchester), the archbishop of Canterbury is ex officio one of the Lords Spiritual of the House of Lords. They are one of the highest-ranking people in England and the highest ranking non-royal in the United Kingdom's order of precedence.

Since Henry VIII broke with Rome, the archbishops of Canterbury have been selected by the English (British since the Act of Union in 1707) monarch. Since the 20th century, the appointment of archbishops of Canterbury conventionally alternates between Anglo-Catholics and Evangelicals.

The previous archbishop, Justin Welby, was the 105th holder of the office; he was enthroned at Canterbury Cathedral on 21 March 2013. As archbishop he signed himself as + Justin Cantuar. On 12 November 2024, he announced his decision to resign; he did so effective 7 January 2025.

Two other former archbishops were living as of 2026: George Carey (born 1935), the 103rd archbishop; and Rowan Williams (born 1950), the 104th archbishop.

=== Additional roles ===
In addition to their office, the archbishop holds a number of other positions; for example, they are joint president of the Council of Christians and Jews in the United Kingdom. Some positions they formally hold ex officio and others virtually so (the incumbent of the day, although appointed personally, is appointed because of their office). Amongst these are:

- Chancellor of Canterbury Christ Church University
- Visitor for the following academic institutions:
  - All Souls College, Oxford
  - Selwyn College, Cambridge
  - Merton College, Oxford
  - Keble College, Oxford
  - Ridley Hall, Cambridge
  - The University of Kent (main campus located in Canterbury)
  - King's College London
  - University of King's College
  - Sutton Valence School
  - Benenden School
  - Cranbrook School
  - Haileybury and Imperial Service College
  - Harrow School
  - King's College School, Wimbledon
  - The King's School, Canterbury
  - St John's School, Leatherhead
  - Marlborough College
  - Dauntsey's School
  - Wycliffe Hall, Oxford (also Patron)
- Governor of Charterhouse School
- Governor of Wellington College
- Visitor, The Dulwich Charities
- Visitor, Whitgift Foundation
- Visitor, Hospital of the Blessed Trinity, Guildford (Abbot's Fund)
- Trustee, Bromley College
- Trustee, Allchurches Trust
- President, Corporation of Church House, Westminster
- Director, Canterbury Diocesan Board of Finance
- Patron, St Edmund's School Canterbury
- Patron, The University of King's College, Halifax, Nova Scotia
- Patron, The Worshipful Company of Parish Clerks
- Patron, Prisoners Abroad
- Patron, The Kent Savers Credit Union
- Patron, Sanctuary Mental Health Ministries

=== Ecumenical and interfaith ===
The archbishop is also a president of Churches Together in England (an ecumenical organisation). Geoffrey Fisher, 99th archbishop of Canterbury, was the first since 1397 to visit Rome, where he held private talks with Pope John XXIII in 1960. In 2005, Rowan Williams became the first archbishop of Canterbury to attend a papal funeral since the Reformation. He also attended the inauguration of Pope Benedict XVI. The 101st archbishop, Donald Coggan, was the first to attend a papal inauguration, that of Pope John Paul II in 1978.

Since 2002, the archbishop has co-sponsored the Alexandria Middle East Peace process with the Grand Mufti of Egypt. In July 2008, the archbishop attended a conference of Christians, Jews and Muslims convened by the king of Saudi Arabia at which the notion of the "clash of civilizations" was rejected. Delegates agreed "on international guidelines for dialogue among the followers of religions and cultures." Delegates said that "the deepening of moral values and ethical principles, which are common denominators among such followers, would help strengthen stability and achieve prosperity for all humans."

== Origins ==
Arms of the see of Canterbury. Nearly 500 years after the Reformation, the arms still depict the pallium, a symbol of the authority of the Pope and metropolitan archbishops.

It has been suggested that the Roman province of Britannia had four archbishops, seated at Londinium (London), Eboracum (York), Lindum Colonia (Lincoln) and Corinium Dobunnorum (Cirencester). However, in the 5th and 6th centuries Britannia began to be overrun by pagan, Germanic peoples who came to be known collectively as the Anglo-Saxons. Of the kingdoms they created, Kent arguably had the closest links with European politics, trade and culture, because it was conveniently situated for communication with continental Europe. In the late 6th century, King Æthelberht of Kent married a Christian Frankish princess named Bertha, possibly before becoming king, and certainly a number of years before the arrival of the first Christian mission to England. He permitted the preaching of Christianity.

The first archbishop of Canterbury was Saint Augustine of Canterbury (not to be confused with Saint Augustine of Hippo), who arrived in Kent in 597 AD, having been sent by Pope Gregory I on a mission to the English. He was accepted by King Æthelbert, on his conversion to Christianity, about the year 598. It seems that Pope Gregory, ignorant of recent developments in the former Roman province, including the spread of the Pelagian heresy, had intended the new archiepiscopal sees for England to be established in London and York. In the event, Canterbury was chosen instead of London, owing to political circumstances. Since then the archbishops of Canterbury have been referred to as occupying the Chair of St. Augustine.

A gospel book believed to be directly associated with St Augustine's mission survives in the Parker Library, Corpus Christi College, University of Cambridge, England. Catalogued as Cambridge Manuscript 286, it has been positively dated to 6th-century Italy and this bound book, the St Augustine Gospels, is still used during the swearing-in ceremony of new archbishops of Canterbury.

Before the break with papal authority in the 16th century, the Church of England was an integral part of the Western European church. Since the break the Church of England, an established national church, still considers itself part of the broader Western Catholic tradition (although this is not accepted by the Roman Catholic Church which regards Anglicanism as schismatic and does not accept Anglican holy orders as valid) as well as being the "mother church" of the worldwide Anglican Communion.

The Report of the Commissioners appointed by his Majesty to inquire into the Ecclesiastical Revenues of England and Wales (1835) noted the net annual revenue for the Canterbury see was £19,182.

== Province and Diocese of Canterbury ==
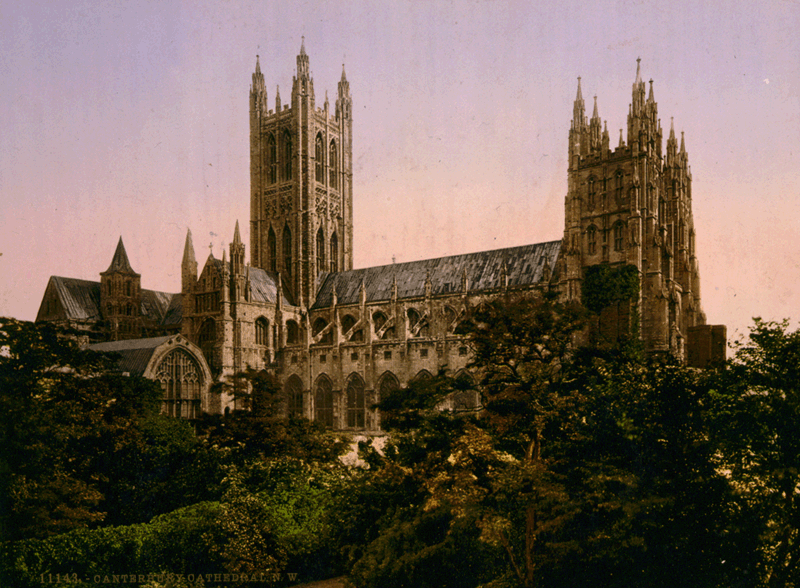
View of Canterbury Cathedral from the north west c. 1890–1900

The archbishop of Canterbury exercises metropolitical (or supervisory) jurisdiction over the Province of Canterbury, which encompasses thirty of the forty-two dioceses of the Church of England, with the rest falling within the Province of York. The four Welsh dioceses were also under the province of Canterbury until 1920 when they were transferred from the established church of England to the disestablished Church in Wales.

The archbishop of Canterbury has a ceremonial provincial curia, or court, consisting of some of the senior bishops of their province. The bishop of London — the most senior cleric of the church with the exception of the two archbishops — serves as Canterbury's provincial dean, the bishop of Winchester as chancellor, the bishop of Lincoln as vice-chancellor, the bishop of Salisbury as precentor, the bishop of Worcester as chaplain and the bishop of Rochester as cross-bearer.

Along with primacy over the archbishop of York, the archbishop of Canterbury also has a precedence of honour over the other bishops of the Anglican Communion. They are recognised as primus inter pares, or first amongst equals. They do not, however, exercise any direct authority in the provinces outside England, except in certain minor roles dictated by Canon in those provinces (for example, they are the judge in the event of an ecclesiastical prosecution against the archbishop of Wales). They do hold metropolitical authority over several extra-provincial Anglican churches, and they serve as ex officio bishop of the Falkland Islands.

As of 2024 the archbishop has four suffragan bishops:

- The bishop of Dover is given the additional title of "bishop in Canterbury" and empowered to act almost as if the bishop of Dover were the diocesan bishop of the Diocese of Canterbury, since the archbishop is so frequently away fulfilling national and international duties.
- Two further suffragans, the bishop of Ebbsfleet and the bishop of Richborough, are provincial episcopal visitors for the whole Province of Canterbury, licensed by the archbishop as "flying bishops" to provide oversight throughout the province to parishes which for conscience' sake cannot accept that women can be ordained in the Sacrament of Ordination in the Church of England.
- The bishop of Maidstone provides alternative episcopal oversight for the province of Canterbury for particular members who take a conservative evangelical view of male headship. On 23 September 2015, Rod Thomas was consecrated bishop of Maidstone. Previously the bishop of Maidstone was an actual suffragan bishop working in the diocese, until it was decided at the diocesan synod of November 2010 that a new bishop would not be appointed.

== Styles and privileges ==
The archbishops of Canterbury and York are both styled as "The Most Reverend"; retired archbishops are styled as "The Right Reverend". The archbishop is, by convention, appointed to the Privy Council and may, therefore, also use the style of "The Right Honourable" for life, unless later removed from the council. In formal documents, the archbishop of Canterbury is referred to as "The Most Reverend Forenames, by Divine Providence Lord Archbishop of Canterbury, Primate of All England and Metropolitan". In debates in the House of Lords, the archbishop is referred to as "The Most Reverend Primate, the Archbishop of Canterbury". "The Right Honourable" is not used in either instance. They may also be formally addressed as "Your Grace" or, more informally, as "Archbishop".

The surname of the archbishop of Canterbury is not always used in formal documents; often, only the first name and see are mentioned. The archbishop is legally entitled to sign their name as "Cantuar:" (from the Latin Cantuariensis meaning "of Canterbury"). The right to use a title as a legal signature is permitted to only bishops, peers of the realm and peers by courtesy. Justin Welby as archbishop of Canterbury usually signed as "+Justin Cantuar:".

In the English and Welsh order of precedence, the archbishop of Canterbury is ranked above all individuals in the realm, with the exception of the sovereign and members of the royal family. Immediately below them is the lord chancellor and then the archbishop of York.

The archbishop of Canterbury awards academic degrees, commonly called "Lambeth degrees".

== Residences ==
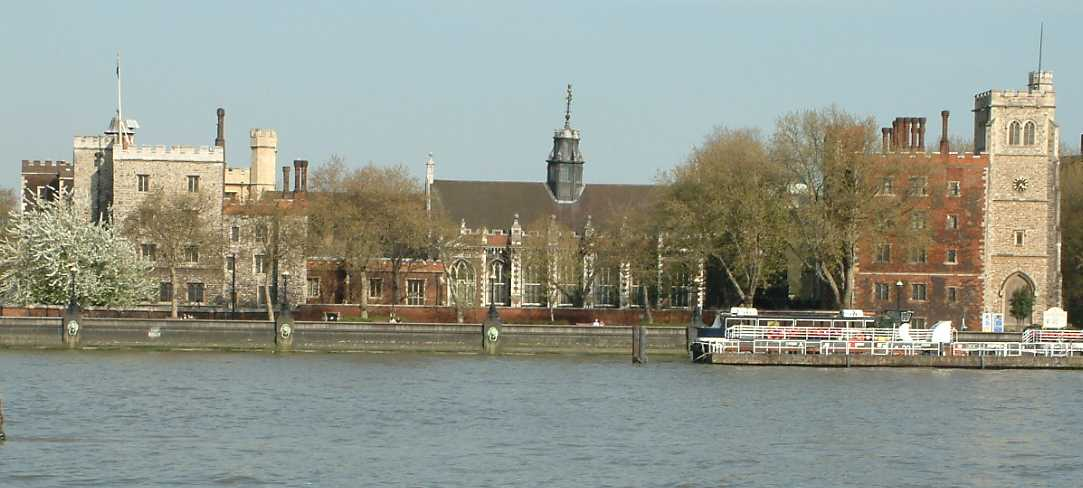
The Archbishop of Canterbury's official London residence and office is Lambeth Palace, photographed looking east across the River Thames

The archbishop of Canterbury's official residence and office in London is Lambeth Palace. They also have an apartment within the Old Palace, next to Canterbury Cathedral which incorporates some 13th-century fabric of the medieval Archbishop's Palace.

Former seats of the archbishops include:

- Croydon Palace: the summer residence of the archbishops from the 15th to the 18th centuries.
- Addington Palace: purchased as a replacement for Croydon Palace in 1807; sold in 1897.
- Archbishop's Palace, Maidstone: constructed in the 1390s, the palace was seized by the Crown at the time of the Reformation.
- Otford Palace: a medieval palace, rebuilt by Archbishop Warham c. 1515 and forfeited to the Crown by Thomas Cranmer in 1537.
- Archbishop's Palace, Charing: a palace existed from at least the 13th century; seized by the Crown after the Dissolution. Remnants survive as a farmhouse.
- Knole House: built by Archbishop Bourchier in the second half of the 15th century, it was forfeited to the Crown by Archbishop Cranmer in 1538.

== List of recent archbishops ==
Since 1900, the following have served as archbishop of Canterbury:

- 1896–1902: Frederick Temple
- 1903–1928: Randall Davidson
- 1928–1942: Cosmo Gordon Lang
- 1942–1944: William Temple
- 1945–1961: Geoffrey Fisher
- 1961–1974: Michael Ramsey
- 1974–1980: Donald Coggan
- 1980–1991: Robert Runcie
- 1991–2002: George Carey
- 2002–2012: Rowan Williams
- 2013–2025: Justin Welby
- 2026–present: Sarah Mullally

== Archbishops who became peers ==
From 1660 to 1902, all the archbishops of Canterbury died in office. In 1928, two years before his death, Randall Davidson became the first to voluntarily resign his office. All his successors except William Temple (who died in office in 1944) have also resigned their office before death.

Until 2025, all archbishops who retired were immediately given peerages: initially hereditary baronies (although both recipients of such titles died without male heirs and so their titles became extinct on their deaths), and life peerages after the enactment of the Life Peerages Act 1958. Such titles have allowed retired archbishops to retain the seats in the House of Lords which they held ex officio before their retirement. Justin Welby, who resigned in January 2025, has not received a peerage.

Archbishop	Title	Notes
Randall Davidson	Baron Davidson of Lambeth in 1928	Extinct in 1930
Cosmo Gordon Lang	Baron Lang of Lambeth in 1942	Extinct in 1945
Geoffrey Fisher	Baron Fisher of Lambeth for life in 1961	Extinct in 1972
Michael Ramsey	Baron Ramsey of Canterbury for life in 1974	Extinct in 1988
Donald Coggan	Baron Coggan for life in 1980	Extinct in 2000
Robert Runcie	Baron Runcie for life in 1991	Extinct in 2000
George Carey	Baron Carey of Clifton for life in 2002	Extant
Rowan Williams	Baron Williams of Oystermouth for life in 2013	Extant (retired from the House in 2020)

== See also ==
- Accord of Winchester
- Armorial of archbishops of Canterbury
- Ecumenical Patriarch of Constantinople
- Religion in the United Kingdom
