= Anglican Communion =

International Christian communion

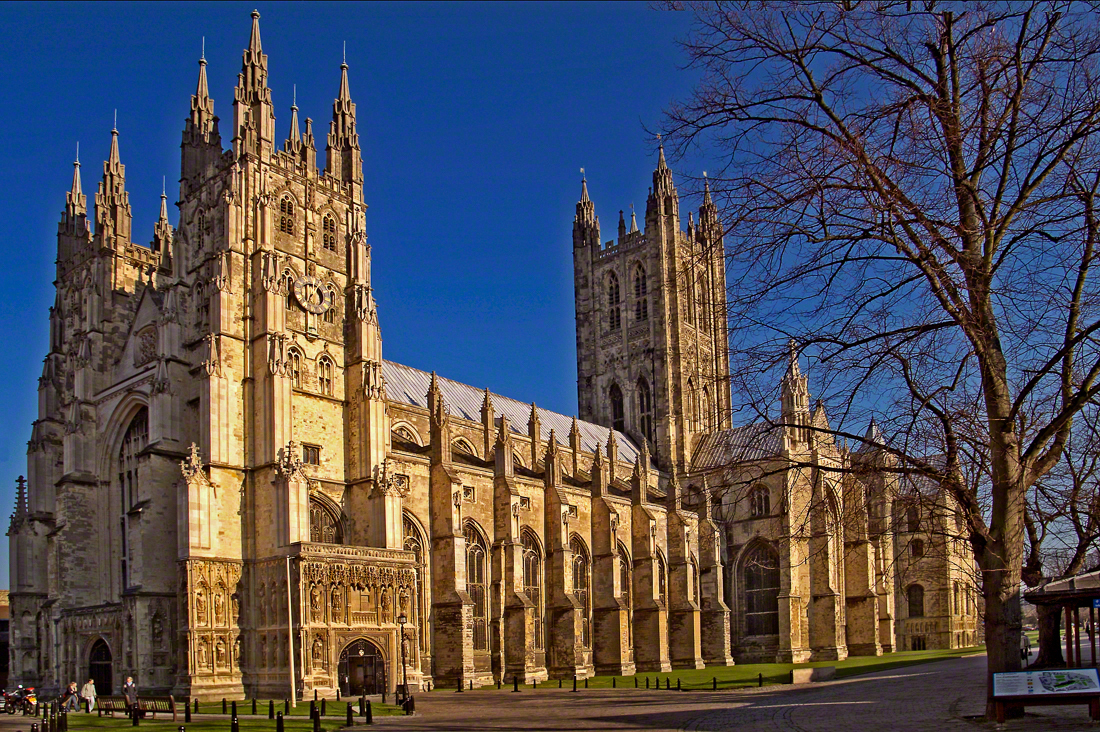
- Canterbury Cathedral
- Type: Communion
- Classification: Protestant (Note: Referring to itself as the Via Media, or the Middle Way in the English language, Anglicanism encompasses various theological and doctrinal identities, including Anglo-Catholic Anglicanism, Liberal Anglicanism, Evangelical Anglicanism and many others.)
- Orientation: Anglican
- Scripture: Protestant Bible
- Theology: Anglican doctrine
- Polity: Episcopal
- Primate: Sarah Mullally
- Secretary General: Anthony Poggo
- Region: Worldwide
- Headquarters: London, England
- Founder: Charles Longley
- Origin: 1867; 159 years ago Lambeth Conference, London, England
- Separated from: Roman Catholic Church
- Branched from: Church of England
- Separations: Continuing Anglican movement (1977); Some participants in the Anglican realignment (since 2002; partial); Personal ordinariate (2009)
- Members: 85–110 million (2025)
- Official website: anglicancommunion.org
- Logo

The Anglican Communion (AC) is a Christian communion consisting of the autocephalous national and regional churches historically in full communion with the See of Canterbury. Member churches exercise jurisdictional independence but share a common heritage concerning Anglican identity and commitment to scripture, tradition, and reason as sources of authority. The Archbishop of Canterbury acts as a focus of unity, recognised as primus inter pares ("first among equals"), but without formal authority in Anglican provinces outside of the Church of England. Most, but not all, member churches of the communion are the historic national or regional Anglican churches.

With approximately 85–110 million members in 2025, among its 47 member churches, it is the third or fourth largest Christian communion of churches globally, after the Catholic, Eastern Orthodox, and, possibly, World Communion of Reformed Churches. (Note: The Anglican Communion (AC) claims approximately 85 million members. The denominations that make up the World Communion of Reformed Churches (WCRC), with their full members, collectively claim over 100 million members. Therefore, according to self-reported figures, the WCRC is larger than the AC, considering only full members. However, some sources indicate that the total membership of the AC churches is actually 110 million. This would make the AC larger than the WCRC, if only the WCRC's full members are counted. Among the WCRC's associate members are the China Christian Council and the Disciples Ecumenical Consultative Council, which together represent over 40 million people. Therefore, if the WCRC's associate and affiliate members are counted, the WCRC has approximately 140 million members and surpasses any Protestant communion in the world. Therefore, the position of WCRC and AC as the third or fourth largest Christian communion depends on the number considered for the AC, as well as whether or not the associate and affiliate members of WCRC are included in the count.) In 2021, excluding the United and Uniting churches, research published in the World Christian Database estimated that the Anglican Communion had approximately 94,976,000 members. The Anglican Communion considers baptism to be "the traditional gauge" or definition for membership.

The Anglican Communion was officially and formally organised and recognised as such at the Lambeth Conference in 1867 in London under the leadership of Charles Longley, Archbishop of Canterbury. The churches of the Anglican Communion consider themselves to be part of the one, holy, catholic and apostolic church, with their liturgy based on the Book of Common Prayer. The traditional origins of Anglican doctrine are summarised in the Thirty-nine Articles (1571) and The Books of Homilies.

As in the Church of England itself, the Anglican Communion includes the broad spectrum of beliefs and liturgical practises found in the Evangelical, Central and Anglo-Catholic traditions of Anglicanism; both the larger Reformed Anglican and the smaller Arminian Anglican theological perspectives have been represented. Each national or regional church is fully independent, retaining its own legislative process and episcopal polity under the leadership of a local primate. For many adherents, Anglicanism represents a distinct form of Reformed Protestantism that emerged under the influence of the Reformer Thomas Cranmer; for others, it is a via media between two branches of Protestantism—Lutheranism and Calvinism; or for yet others, it is a denomination that is both Catholic and Reformed. Full participation in the sacramental life of each church is available to all communicant members.

Most members of the churches of the Anglican Communion live in the Anglosphere: a group of dozens of countries and regions that are predominantly English-speaking, often former British colonies or territories, many of which still voluntarily associate as members of the Commonwealth. Because of their historical link to England (ecclesia anglicana means "English church"), some of the member churches are known as "Anglican", such as the Anglican Church of Canada. Others, for example the Church of Ireland and the Scottish Episcopal and American Episcopal churches, have official names that do not include "Anglican". Conversely, some churches that do use the name "Anglican" are not part of the communion. These have generally disaffiliated over disagreement with the progress and direction of the broader communion.

== History ==
The Anglican Communion traces much of its growth to the older mission organisations of the Church of England such as the Society for Promoting Christian Knowledge (founded 1698), the Society for the Propagation of the Gospel in Foreign Parts (founded 1701) and the Church Missionary Society (founded 1799). (Note: Efforts to grow and develop the church in lands outside the British Isles began with the Society for Promoting Christian Knowledge (1698) and the Society for the Propagation of the Gospel in Foreign Parts (1701) but received a significant boost from the Church Mission Society (1799).) (Note: The Church Missionary Society, originally called the Society for Missions to Africa and the East, was founded in 1799... Though later in date than the S.P.C.K. and the S.P.G. it became the first effective organ of the C. of E. for missions to the heathen... Its theology has been consistently Evangelical.) The Church of England (which until the 20th century included the Church in Wales) initially separated from the Roman Catholic Church in 1534 in the reign of Henry VIII, reunited briefly in 1555 under Mary I and then separated again in 1570 under Elizabeth I (the Roman Catholic Church excommunicated Elizabeth I in 1570 in response to the Act of Supremacy 1559).

The Church of England has always thought of itself not as a new foundation but rather as a reformed continuation of the ancient "English Church" (Ecclesia Anglicana) and a reassertion of that church's rights. As such it was a distinctly national phenomenon. The Church of Scotland was formed as a separate church from the Roman Catholic Church as a result of the Scottish Reformation in 1560 and the later formation of the Scottish Episcopal Church began in 1582 (in the reign of James VI) over disagreements about the role of bishops.

The Church of England was the established church not only in England, but in its trans-Oceanic colonies. Thus the only member churches of the present Anglican Communion existing by the mid-18th century were the Church of England, its closely linked sister church the Church of Ireland (which also separated from Roman Catholicism under Henry VIII) and the Scottish Episcopal Church which for parts of the 17th and 18th centuries was partially underground (it was suspected of Jacobite sympathies).

The oldest-surviving Anglican church building outside the British Isles is St Peter's Church in St. George's, Bermuda, established in 1612 (though the actual building had to be rebuilt several times over the following century). This is also the oldest surviving non-Roman Catholic church in the New World. It remained part of the Church of England until 1978 when the Anglican Church of Bermuda was formed.

=== Global spread of Anglicanism ===
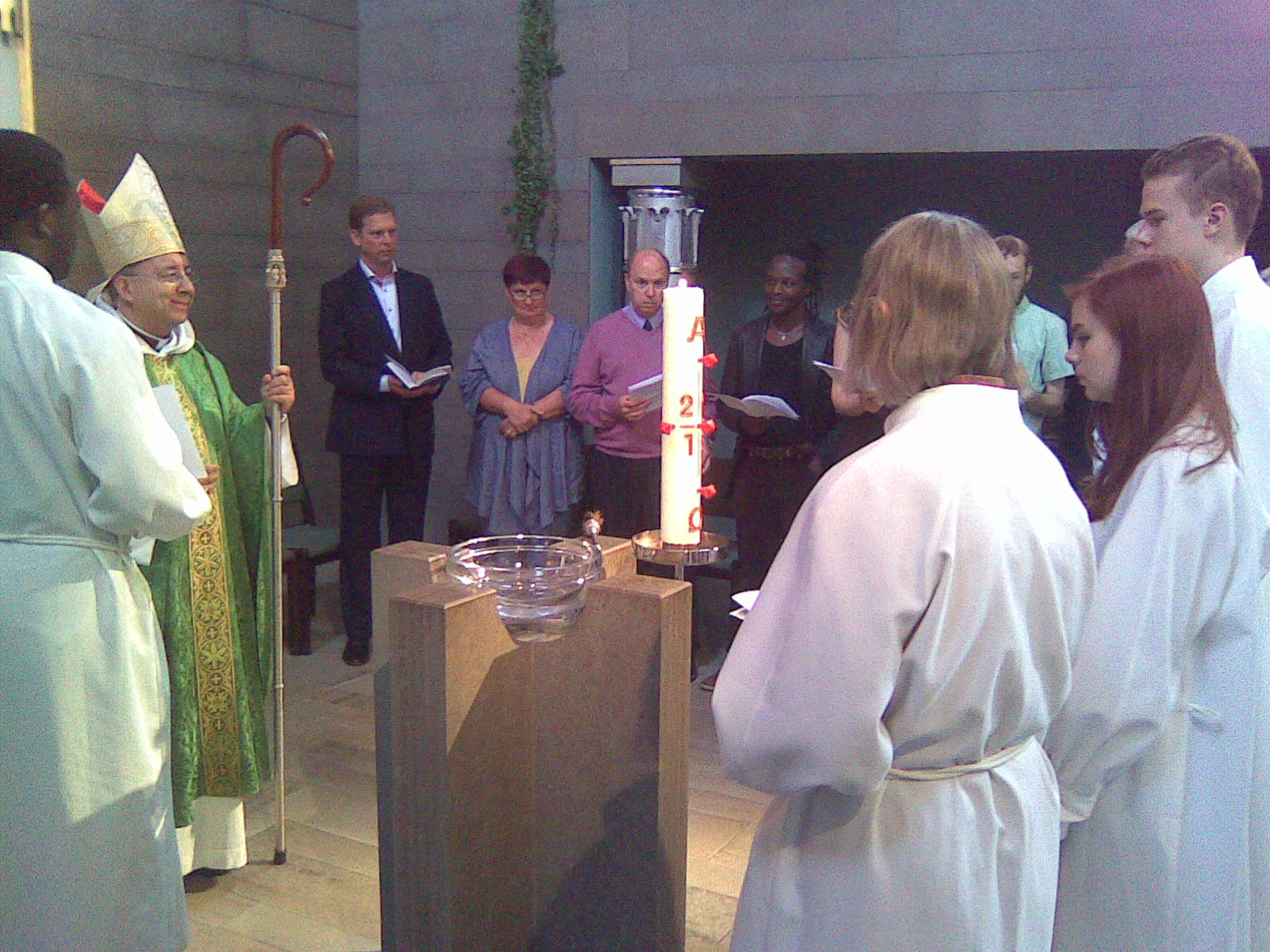
Anglican confirmation at the Mikael Agricola Church in Helsinki, Finland, in June 2013

The enormous expansion in the 18th and 19th centuries of the British Empire brought Anglicanism along with it. At first all these colonial churches were under the jurisdiction of the bishop of London. After the American Revolution, the parishes in the newly independent United States found it necessary to break formally from a church whose supreme governor was (and remains) the British monarch. Thus they formed their own dioceses and national church, the Episcopal Church in the United States of America, in a mostly amicable separation.

At about the same time, in the colonies which remained linked to the crown, the Church of England began to appoint colonial bishops. In 1787, Charles Inglis (Bishop of Nova Scotia) was appointed with jurisdiction over all of British North America; in time several more colleagues were appointed to sees in other provinces in present-day Canada. In 1814, a bishop of Calcutta was appointed. In 1824 the first bishop was sent to the West Indies. And in 1836 Australia received its first Anglican bishop. By 1840 there were still only ten colonial bishops in the Church of England; but this small beginning quickly facilitated the growth of Anglicanism around the world. In 1841, a "Colonial Bishoprics Council" was set up and soon many more dioceses were created.

In time, it became natural to group these into provinces and a metropolitan bishop was appointed for each province. Although it had at first been somewhat established in many colonies, in 1861 it was ruled that, except where specifically established, the Church of England had just the same legal position as any other church. Thus a colonial bishop and colonial diocese was by nature quite a different thing from their counterparts back home. In time bishops came to be appointed locally rather than from England and eventually national synods began to pass ecclesiastical legislation independent of England.

A crucial step in the development of the modern communion was the idea of the Lambeth Conferences (discussed above). These conferences demonstrated that the bishops of disparate churches could manifest the unity of the church in their episcopal collegiality despite the absence of universal legal ties. Some bishops were initially reluctant to attend, fearing that the meeting would declare itself a council with power to legislate for the church; but it agreed to pass only advisory resolutions. These Lambeth Conferences have been held roughly every ten years since 1878 (the second such conference) and remain the most visible coming-together of the whole communion.

The Lambeth Conference of 1998 included what has been seen by Philip Jenkins and others as a "watershed in global Christianity". The 1998 Lambeth Conference considered the issue of the theology of same-sex attraction in relation to human sexuality. At this 1998 conference, for the first time in centuries, the primates of churches in many developing regions—including some from Africa, Asia and Latin America—prevailed over the bishops of more prosperous countries (many from the US, Canada and the UK) who had supported a more progressive interpretation of Anglican doctrine. Seen in this light, 1998 is a date that marked the shift from a West-dominated Christianity to one wherein the growing churches of "the two-thirds world" are predominant.

=== 21st-century de facto schisms ===
Many of the provinces in developed countries have continued to adopt more liberal stances on sexuality and other issues, resulting in a number of de facto schisms, such as the series of splits which led to the creation of the Anglican Church in North America. Many churches are now in full communion with only some other church members of the Communion, but are not with others; however, most churches that have historically been members continue to claim to be part of the Anglican Communion.

On 20 February 2023, following the decision of the Church of England to allow priests to bless same-sex partnerships, during regularly scheduled worship services, ten communion provinces and Anglican realignment churches, formed into the new Global South Fellowship of Anglican Churches, released a statement stating that they had declared "impaired communion" with the Church of England and no longer recognised Justin Welby as "first among equals" among the bishops of the communion.

On 16 October 2025, the chairman of the Global Fellowship of Confessing Anglicans, Laurent Mbanda, declared the future creation of a "Global Anglican Communion" independent from the See of Canterbury but also asserted "[they] have not left the Anglican Communion; [they] are the Anglican Communion." "The statement outlining that plan was signed by one person, Rwanda Archbishop Laurent Mbanda, who serves as chair of GAFCON's primate council." Following the announcement, Mbanda stated that the announcement of the "Global Anglican Communion" was "closer to a rebrand than a new organization" and that they are reforming the existing Anglican Communion. Bishops affiliated with GAFCON, in Kenya and Congo, responded that their provinces plan to remain a part of the existing structures of the Anglican Communion. In December 2025, Mbanda released another letter restating his plan to remain in the Anglican Communion saying, "We will not walk with sin, but neither will we walk away from the Anglican Communion."

On 3-4 March 2026, meeting in Abuja, GAFCON member churches confirmed their intention to remain a part of the Anglican Communion, rejecting the word "schism" and framing their efforts as a reorganization and "continuity". GAFCON had announced their plan to move forward with electing a "rival" primus inter pares to the Archbishop of Canterbury, with some member churches continuing to oppose the ordination of women as bishops. On 5 March 2026, GAFCON decided not to elect a "rival" primus inter pares to the Archbishop of Canterbury, opting instead to elect a "Global Anglican Council". As of 2025, GAFCON claims to represent upwards of 85% of the world's practising Anglicans. Peer-reviewed research from 2015 and 2016 indicates that the GAFCON-aligned provinces represent closer to 45% of practising Anglicans and just over 54% of members baptised in any of the provinces of the Anglican Communion.

== Differences and controversies ==
Some effects of the Anglican Communion's dispersed authority have been differences of opinion (and conflicts) arising over divergent practices and doctrine in the various parts of the communion. Disputes that had been confined to the Church of England could be dealt with legislatively in that realm, but as the communion spread into new countries and territories and across disparate cultures, controversies sometimes multiplied and intensified. These controversies have generally been of two types: liturgical and social.

=== Ordination of women ===
Rapid social change and the dissipation of British cultural hegemony over its former colonies contributed to disputes over the role of women, and the parameters of marriage and divorce. In the late 1970s, the Continuing Anglican movement produced a number of new church bodies in opposition to women's ordination, prayer book changes, and the new understandings concerning marriage. As of 2024, some provinces of the communion, representing approximately 3% of Anglicans worldwide, do not ordain women as deacons, priests, or bishops; two ordain women only as deacons, 16 ordain women as deacons and priests but not as bishops, and 22 provinces, representing about "two thirds of Anglicanism", ordain women as deacons, priests, and bishops. As of 2024, three provinces of the Anglican Communion (South East Asia, Papua New Guinea, and Melanesia) do not ordain women as deacons, priests, or bishops. On 28 January 2026, Sarah Mullally, previously bishop of London, was elected as archbishop of Canterbury, becoming the first woman to hold the see and act as the "first among equals" within the Anglican Communion. GAFCON Primates Council chairman (Laurent Mbanda) claimed a predominant reservation against women's ordination to the episcopacy.

=== Anglo-Catholicism ===
The first such controversy of note concerned that of the growing influence of the Catholic Revival manifested in the Tractarian and so-called Ritualist controversies of the late 19th and early 20th centuries. This controversy produced the Free Church of England and, in the United States and Canada, the Reformed Episcopal Church.

=== Abortion and euthanasia ===
While individual Anglicans and member churches within the communion differ over the circumstances in which abortion should or should not be permitted, Lambeth Conference resolutions have consistently held to a conservative view on the issue. The 1930 conference, the first to be held since the initial legalisation of abortion in Europe (in Russia in 1920), stated:

The Conference further records its abhorrence of the sinful practice of abortion.

The 1958 conference's Family in Contemporary Society report affirmed the following position on abortion and was commended by the 1968 conference:

In the strongest terms Christians reject the practice of induced abortion or infanticide, which involves the killing of a life already conceived (as well as a violation of the personality of the mother), save at the dictate of strict and undeniable medical necessity ... the sacredness of life is, in Christian eyes, an absolute which should not be violated.

The subsequent Lambeth Conference, in 1978, made no change to this position and commended the need for "programmes at diocesan level, involving both men and women ... to emphasise the sacredness of all human life, the moral issues inherent in clinical abortion, and the possible implications of genetic engineering."

In the context of debates around and proposals for the legalisation of euthanasia and assisted suicide, the 1998 conference affirmed that "life is God-given and has intrinsic sanctity, significance and worth".

=== Same-sex unions and LGBT clergy ===
More recently, disagreements over homosexuality have strained the unity of the communion as well as its relationships with other Christian denominations, leading to another round of withdrawals from the Anglican Communion. Some churches were founded outside the Anglican Communion in the late 20th and early 21st centuries, largely in opposition to the ordination of openly homosexual bishops and other clergy and are usually referred to as belonging to the Anglican realignment movement, or else as "orthodox" Anglicans. These disagreements were especially noted when The Episcopal Church (US) consecrated an openly gay bishop in a same-sex relationship, Gene Robinson, in 2003, which led some Episcopalians to defect and found the Anglican Church in North America (ACNA); then, the debate reignited when the Church of England agreed to allow clergy to enter into same-sex civil partnerships, as long as they remained celibate, in 2005. The Church of Nigeria opposed the Episcopal Church's decision as well as the Church of England's approval for celibate civil partnerships.

According to the BBC, "The more liberal provinces that are open to changing Church doctrine on marriage in order to allow for same-sex unions include Brazil, Canada, New Zealand, Scotland, South India, South Africa, the US and Wales". In 2023, the Church of England announced that it will authorise "prayers of thanksgiving, dedication and for God's blessing for same-sex couples". The Church of England also permits clergy to enter into same-sex civil partnerships. In 2024, the Church of England's General Synod voted to support allowing clergy to enter in civil same-sex marriages. In 2023, the Anglican Church of Southern Africa's bishops approved the drafting of prayers that could be said with same-sex couples and the draft prayers were published for consideration in 2024. In 2024, Saldanha Bay became the first Southern African diocese to approve clergy to bless same-sex couples. The Church of Ireland has no official position on civil unions, and one senior cleric has entered into a same-sex civil partnership. The Church of Ireland recognised that it will "treat civil partners the same as spouses". The Anglican Church of Australia does not have an official position on homosexuality, and each diocese is allowed to bless same-sex couples if they choose. In 2025, the Church in Wales elected Cherry Vann as the Archbishop of Wales, making her the first woman to serve as Archbishop in the United Kingdom and the first openly LGBTQ and partnered bishop to be a Primate within the Anglican Communion.

The conservative Anglican churches encouraging the realignment movement are more concentrated in the Global South. For example, the Anglican Church of Kenya, the Church of Nigeria and the Church of Uganda have opposed homosexuality. GAFCON, a fellowship of conservative Anglican churches, has appointed "missionary bishops" in response to the disagreements with the perceived liberalisation in the Anglican churches in North America and Europe. In 2023, ten archbishops within the Anglican Communion and two breakaway churches in North America and Brazil from the Global South Fellowship of Anglican Churches (GSFA) declared a state of impaired communion with the Church of England and announced that they would no longer recognise the archbishop of Canterbury as the "first among equals" among the bishops in the Anglican Communion. However, in the same statement, the ten archbishops said that they would not leave the Anglican Communion. In 2024, the GSFA met again establishing "a new structure", no longer recognising the Archbishop of Canterbury "as the de facto leader" of the Anglican Communion, but the GSFA reiterated that they intend to remain in the Anglican Communion. In 2025, after the Church in Wales elected the first openly lesbian and partnered primate in the Anglican Communion, the GSFA criticized the appointment.

Debates about social theology and ethics have occurred at the same time as debates on prayer book revision and the acceptable grounds for achieving full communion with non-Anglican churches.

== Ecclesiology, polity and ethos ==
The Anglican Communion has no official legal existence nor any governing structure that might exercise authority over the member churches. There is an Anglican Communion Office in London, under the aegis of the archbishop of Canterbury, but it serves only in a supporting and organisational role. The communion is held together by a shared history, expressed in its ecclesiology, polity and ethos, and also by participation in international consultative bodies.

Three elements have been important in holding the communion together: first, the shared ecclesial structure of the component churches, manifested in an episcopal polity maintained through the apostolic succession of bishops and synodical government; second, the principle of belief expressed in worship, investing importance in approved prayer books and their rubrics; and third, the historical documents and the writings of early Anglican divines that have influenced the ethos of the communion.

Originally, the Church of England was self-contained and relied for its unity and identity on its own history, its traditional legal and episcopal structure, and its status as an established church of the state. As such, Anglicanism was from the outset a movement with an explicitly episcopal polity, a characteristic that has been vital in maintaining the unity of the communion by conveying the episcopate's role in manifesting visible catholicity and ecumenism.

Early in its development following the English Reformation, Anglicanism developed a vernacular prayer book, called the Book of Common Prayer. Unlike other traditions, Anglicanism has never been governed by a magisterium nor by appeal to one founding theologian, nor by an extra-credal summary of doctrine (such as the Westminster Confession of the Presbyterian churches). Instead, Anglicans have typically appealed to the Book of Common Prayer (1662) and its offshoots as a guide to Anglican theology and practise. This has had the effect of inculcating in Anglican identity and confession the principle of lex orandi, lex credendi ("the law of praying [is] the law of believing").

Protracted conflict through the 17th century, with radical Protestants on the one hand and Roman Catholics who recognised the primacy of the Pope on the other, resulted in an association of churches that was both deliberately vague about doctrinal principles, yet bold in developing parameters of acceptable deviation. These parameters were most clearly articulated in the various rubrics of the successive prayer books, as well as the Thirty-nine Articles of Religion (1563). These articles have historically shaped and continue to direct the ethos of the communion, an ethos reinforced by its interpretation and expansion by such influential early theologians such as Richard Hooker, Lancelot Andrewes and John Cosin.

With the expansion of the British Empire and the growth of Anglicanism outside Great Britain and Ireland, the communion sought to establish new vehicles of unity. The first major expressions of this were the Lambeth Conferences of the communion's bishops, first convened in 1867 by Charles Longley, the archbishop of Canterbury. From the beginning, these were not intended to displace the autonomy of the emerging provinces of the communion, but to "discuss matters of practical interest, and pronounce what we deem expedient in resolutions which may serve as safe guides to future action".

=== Chicago Lambeth Quadrilateral ===
One of the enduringly influential early resolutions of the conference was the so-called Chicago-Lambeth Quadrilateral of 1888. Its intent was to provide the basis for discussions of reunion with the Roman Catholic and Orthodox churches, but it had the ancillary effect of establishing parameters of Anglican identity. It establishes four principles with these words:

That, in the opinion of this Conference, the following Articles supply a basis on which approach may be by God's blessing made towards Home Reunion:

(a) The Holy Scriptures of the Old and New Testaments, as "containing all things necessary to salvation," and as being the rule and ultimate standard of faith.

(b) The Apostles' Creed, as the Baptismal Symbol; and the Nicene Creed, as the sufficient statement of the Christian faith.

(c) The two Sacraments ordained by Christ Himself – Baptism and the Supper of the Lord – ministered with unfailing use of Christ's Words of Institution, and of the elements ordained by Him.

(d) The Historic Episcopate, locally adapted in the methods of its administration to the varying needs of the nations and peoples called of God into the Unity of His Church.

=== Instruments of communion ===
The archbishop of Canterbury's role is strictly symbolic and unifying, while the communion's three international bodies are consultative and collaborative; their resolutions have no legal effect on the autonomous provinces of the communion. However, in combination those four bodies do function as "instruments of communion", because all churches of the communion participate in them. In order of antiquity, they are:

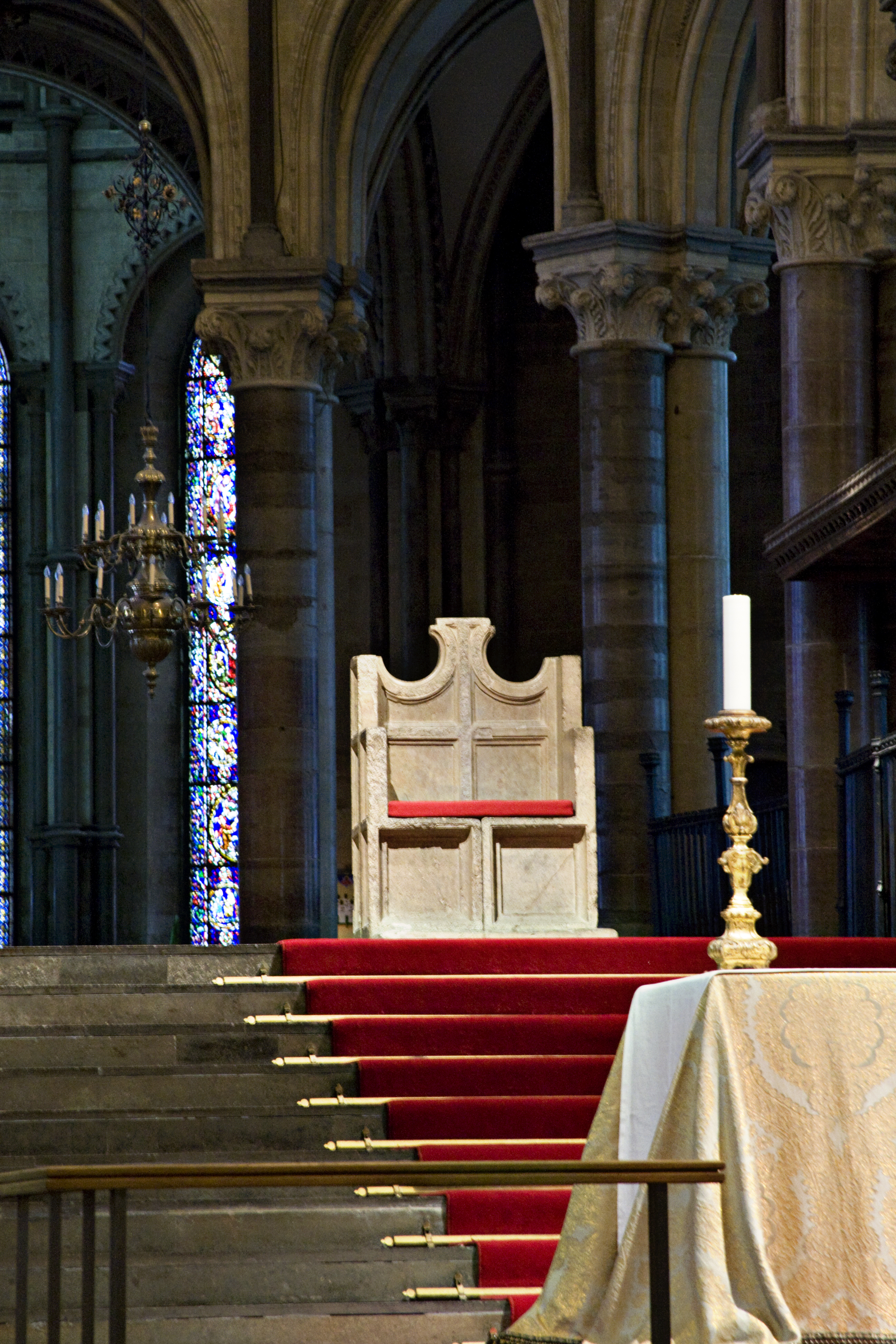
The Chair of St Augustine (the episcopal throne in Canterbury Cathedral, Kent), seat of the archbishop of Canterbury in their role as head of the Anglican Communion (Note: The Chair of St Augustine is the seat of the archbishop of Canterbury in their role as head of the Anglican Communion. Archbishops of Canterbury are enthroned twice: firstly as diocesan ordinary (and metropolitan and primate of the Church of England) in the archbishop's throne, by the archdeacon of Canterbury; and secondly as leader of the worldwide church in the Chair of St Augustine by the senior (by length of service) archbishop of the Anglican Communion. The stone chair is therefore of symbolic significance throughout Anglicanism.)

1. The archbishop of Canterbury functions as the spiritual head of the communion. The archbishop is the focus of unity, because no Anglican church has historically claimed membership in the communion without being in communion with the archbishop of Canterbury. The current archbishop is Sarah Mullally.
2. The Lambeth Conference (first held in 1867) is the oldest Anglican international consultative body. It is a forum for bishops of the communion to reinforce unity and collegiality, to discuss matters of mutual concern, and to pass resolutions intended to act as guidelines to the individual churches. It is held roughly every ten years and invitation is by the archbishop of Canterbury.
3. The Anglican Consultative Council (first met in 1971) was created by a 1968 Lambeth Conference resolution, and meets usually at three-yearly intervals. The council consists of representative bishops, other clergy and laity chosen by the 38 provinces. The body has a permanent secretariat, the Anglican Communion Office, of which the archbishop of Canterbury is president.
4. The Primates' Meeting (first met in 1979) is a forum for international consultation and deliberation, first convened by Archbishop Donald Coggan for "leisurely thought, prayer and deep consultation".

Because there is no binding authority in the Anglican Communion, these international bodies are vehicles for consultation and persuasion. In the late twentieth and early twenty-first centuries, they have debated issues of conformity in doctrine, discipline, worship and ethics. The most controversial issues have related to gender and sexuality: some provinces of the communion (particularly in Africa and Asia) object to the changing acceptance of LGBTQ+ individuals (particularly by the North American and European churches). This has led to disagreements on the churches' differing practices of blessing same-sex unions, ordaining and consecrating priests and bishops who are (or have been) in same-sex relationships, and to the process by which changes were undertaken. Some churches have also objected to the ordination of female priests and bishops. This debate is known as the Anglican realignment.

Those who objected condemned these changes as unscriptural, unilateral, and lacking prior agreement from the communion. The American Episcopal Church and the Anglican Church of Canada responded that their actions had been undertaken after lengthy scriptural and theological reflection, were legal according to their own canons and constitutions, and made after extensive consultation with the provinces of the communion. The Primates' Meeting voted to request those two churches withdraw their delegates from the 2005 meeting of the Anglican Consultative Council. Canada and the United States decided to attend the meeting but without exercising their right to vote. They were not expelled or suspended; there is no mechanism in this voluntary association to suspend or expel an independent province of the communion. Because membership is based on a province's communion with Canterbury, expulsion would require the archbishop of Canterbury's refusal to be in communion with the affected jurisdictions. Following the recommendation of the Windsor Report, Rowan Williams (the then archbishop of Canterbury) established a working group to examine the feasibility of an Anglican covenant which would articulate the conditions for communion in some fashion.

=== Nairobi-Cairo proposals ===
In 2025, the Inter-Anglican Standing Committee on Unity, Faith and Order within the Anglican Communion proposed a series of changes to the Instruments of Communion that would result "in service of a de-centred, polycentric understanding of the mission of the Church... The leadership of the Communion should look like the Communion," according to the report. The Nairobi-Cairo proposals suggests amending the definition of membership in the Anglican Communion to no longer include reference to being in full communion with the Archbishop of Canterbury; instead, the reference to Canterbury would be a historical connection. Additionally, there would be a rotating presidency of the Anglican Consultative Council among the five regions of the communion, and the role of calling the Lambeth Conference and Primates' Meeting, traditionally held by the Archbishop of Canterbury, would include greater input from the Primates' Standing Committee. This has both been described as an effort to further decolonize the structures of the Anglican Communion as well as an effort to hold together autonomous member churches with disagreements.

== Organisation ==
=== Provinces ===
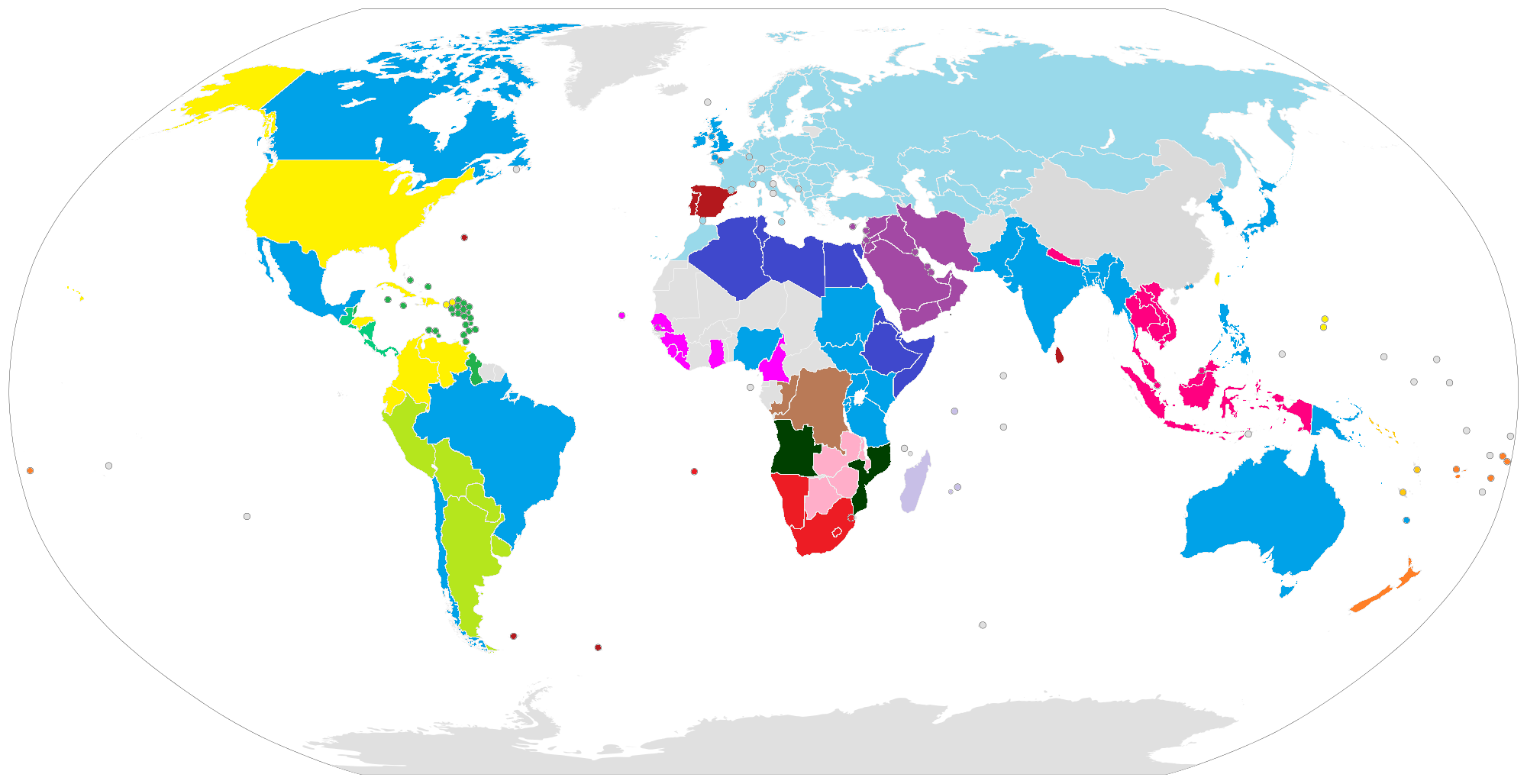
A world map showing the provinces of the Anglican Communion and Global Anglican Communion: National churches, present in only one country Episcopal Church of the United States Church in the Province of the West Indies Anglican Church in Central America Anglican Church of the South America Anglican Church of Southern Africa Anglican Church of Mozambique and Angola Province of the Anglican Church of the Congo Church of the Province of Central Africa / Church of the Province of West Africa Episcopal Church in Jerusalem and the Middle East Episcopal/Anglican Province of Alexandria Church of the Province of the Indian Ocean Anglican Church in Aotearoa, New Zealand and Polynesia Church of the Province of Melanesia Diocese of Gibraltar of the Church of England Church of the Province of South East Asia Extra-provincial to the Archbishop of Canterbury No organised Anglican presence; The Church of Ireland serves both Northern Ireland and the Republic of Ireland and the Anglican Church of Korea serves South Korea and, theoretically, North Korea. Indian Anglicanism is divided into the Church of North India, and the Church of South India. The Diocese in Europe (formally the Diocese of Gibraltar in Europe), in the Province of Canterbury, is also present in Portugal and Spain. The Episcopal Church, USA-affiliated Convocation of Episcopal Churches in Europe has affiliates in Austria, Belgium, France, Georgia, Germany and Italy.

The Anglican Communion, which currently is experiencing impaired communion and division, consists of forty-two autonomous provinces each with its own primate and governing structure and of five extra-provincials under the metropolitan authority of the Archbishop of Canterbury. These provinces may take the form of national churches (such as in Canada, Uganda, or Japan) or a collection of nations (such as the West Indies, Central Africa, or Southeast Asia). The Anglican Communion Office claims at least 90 million members. The Church of England Yearbook reported 93,511,730 members of the Anglican Communion in 2024.

Geographical location of individual members represented by Anglican Communion, World Christian Database (2020) Excluding the United churches
1. Africa (65%)
2. Europe (25%)
3. Oceania (5%)
4. Northern America (3%)
5. Latin America (1%)
6. Asia (1%)

Excluding the United churches in South Asia, the World Christian Database, published in 2021 and produced by the Center for the Study of Global Christianity at Gordon-Conwell Theological Seminary, and the World Christian Encyclopedia, published in 2020 by Edinburgh University Press, estimated that there were approximately 97,399,000 Anglicans in 2020 with 63,556,000 in Africa, 24,400,000 in Europe, 4,565,000 in Oceania, 2,689,000 in Northern America, 1,230,000 in Asia, and 959,000 in Latin America. The United Churches in South Asia include over 5,000,000 in South India, 2,300,000 in North India, 1,900,000 in Pakistan, and 22,600 in Bangladesh.

The Anglican Communion is funded primarily by contributions from member churches. Together, the Church of England and the Episcopal Church contribute 63.3% of the Communion's budget, with most of the rest being contributed by the member churches based in Australia, New Zealand, Canada, Wales, Ireland, Hong Kong, Scotland, and Japan. Numerically, the largest member churches of the Anglican Communion, as measured by total reported membership, not by active membership, are reportedly the churches based in England, Nigeria, Uganda, Kenya, Australia, South India, Southern Africa, South Sudan, Tanzania, and the Episcopal Church.

Provinces	Territorial Jurisdiction	Membership (active members) (Note: Active members are those who regularly attend worship services.)	Membership (Self-identified members) (Note: Self-identified members are those who identify as Anglican when asked about their religion. They include all active members, as well as those who, while not active members, still have some connection to Anglicanism.)	Membership (baptized members) (Note: Baptized members are those who have received Anglican baptism. This number includes active members, self-identified members, and also those who do not identify as Anglican in national censuses and independent surveys when asked about their religion. Some Anglican provinces continue to count as members people who have changed churches, changed religions, abandoned Christianity, and even deceased individuals in their baptized number.)	Year
Episcopal/Anglican Province of Alexandria	Algeria, Djibouti, Egypt, Ethiopia, Eritrea, Libya, Somalia, Tunisia	50,000			2022 (Note: The national census does not report the number of members of this province. Data released by the denomination itself.)
Anglican Church in Aotearoa, New Zealand and Polynesia	New Zealand, Cook Islands, Fiji, Samoa, Tonga	253,631		630,000	2010–2023 (Note: The Anglican Church of New Zealand and Polynesia reports on its own website its 2013 Census membership figure of 459,711. However, the 2021 Census, the most recent, reported only 245,301 Anglicans in the country. This is, therefore, the number of self-identified Anglicans in the country. Goodhew (2017) reported that there are still Anglicans linked to the church in Fiji (6,600), Tonga (1,300), Samoa (340) and the Cook Islands (90). The combined number corresponds to 253,631 people. On the other hand, the book "Growth and Decline in the Anglican Communion: 1980 to the Present," published in 2010, estimated that the church has approximately 630,000 baptized members.)
Anglican Church of Australia	Australia	2,496,273		3,881,000	2001 – 2021 (Note: The Anglican Church of Australia last published statistics in 2001, when it reported having 4,865,328 members. The 2021 Census reported that only 2,496,273 people self-identified as Anglican in the country.)
Church of Bangladesh	Bangladesh	22,600			2022
Anglican Episcopal Church of Brazil	Brazil	19,400		135,000	2012 (Note: The Anglican Episcopal Church of Brazil claimed to have 120,000 members in 2006. However, an independent study, carried out in 2009, published in 2012, reported that only 0.01% of the Brazilian population was Anglican in 2009, which corresponded, in that year, to 19,400 Anglicans. This number corresponds to just 16.16% of what the denomination declared to have in 2006.)
Province of the Anglican Church of Burundi	Burundi	1,000,000		1,276,000	2019
Anglican Church of Canada	Canada	294,931	1,134,315	636,000	2022 (Note: The 2021 Canada Census reported that there were 1,134,315 Anglicans in the country. The denomination's official statistics, however, reveal a much lower number. For this reason, the denomination's own statistics are considered reliable data.)
Church of the Province of Central Africa	Botswana, Malawi, Zambia, Zimbabwe	900,000		1,788,000	2016–2020 (Note: The 2018 Malawi Census reported that there were 410,633 Anglicans in the country. In 2010, according to a report by the Pew Research Center, 87% of Botswana's population was Christian and 2% of Christians in this country (35,380) were Anglicans. The same survey reported that 98% of the population of Zambia was Christian and 4% of the Christians in that country (547,624) were Anglican. Therefore, the sum of the independent statistics is higher than the number released by the denomination itself. For this reason, the statistics of the denomination itself are considered reliable.)
Anglican Church in Central America	Costa Rica, El Salvador, Guatemala, Nicaragua, Panama	35,000	126,000		2010 – 2022 (Note: The Anglican Church of Central America reported having only 35,000 members in 2022. On the other hand, the book Growth and decline in the Anglican communion: 1980 to the present, published in 2010, estimated that the church represents about 126,000 baptized members.)
Anglican Church of Chile	Chile	23,300			2010–2018
Province of the Anglican Church of the Congo	Democratic Republic of the Congo, Republic of Congo	557,000			2016 (Note: In 2010, according to a report by the Pew Research Center, 80% of the population of the Democratic Republic of the Congo was Christian and 2% of the Christians in that country (1,055,456) were Anglican. This number is higher than that released by the denomination itself. For this reason, the statistics of the denomination itself are considered reliable.)
Church of England	England, Crown Dependencies, Europe	1,023,000	15,291,182	21,755,000	2022–2025 (Note: The Church of England claims 26 million baptized members. Of these, however, according to its 2024 statistics, only 1,019,000 are active members. According to data from the British Social Attitudes survey, in 2018, 14% of the UK population, or 9,304,400, identified themselves as members of the church. In 2023, the Bertelsmann Foundation estimated that 43% of the British population (whose total number was 68,490,000 that year) was Christian, and 53% of Christians identified as Anglican. According to this survey, 23% of British people were Anglican, corresponding to 15,752,700 people that year. Subtracting the number of self-identified Anglicans in Scotland, Wales, and Ireland, leaves 15,291,182 in England.)
Hong Kong Sheng Kung Hui	Hong Kong, Macau	30,000			2004
Church of the Province of the Indian Ocean	Madagascar, Mauritius, Seychelles	600,000			2016
Church of Ireland	Republic of Ireland, Northern Ireland	343,400			2023 (Note: The 2022 Republic of Ireland Census reported that there were 126,658 Anglicans in the country. The 2021 Northern Ireland Census reported that there were 219,788 Anglicans in the country. The numbers reported by the denomination itself are slightly lower. For this reason, the denomination's own statistics are considered reliable.)
Nippon Sei Ko Kai	Japan	22,000	58,000		2010–2022 (Note: The Anglican Church in Japan reported having only 22,000 members in 2022. On the other hand, the book Growth and decline in the Anglican communion: 1980 to the present, published in 2010, estimated that the church represents about 58,000 baptized members.)
Episcopal Church in Jerusalem and the Middle East	Bahrain, Cyprus, Iran, Iraq, Israel, Jordan, Kuwait, Lebanon, Oman, Palestine, Qatar, Saudi Arabia, Syria, United Arab Emirates, Yemen	39,882			2016
Anglican Church of Kenya	Kenya	5,860,000		8,288,000	2017
Anglican Church of Korea	South Korea, North Korea	65,000	85,900		2010–2017 (Note: The Anglican Church of Korea reported having only 65,000 members in 2006. On the other hand, the book Growth and decline in the Anglican communion: 1980 to the present, published in 2010, estimated that the church represents about 80,110 baptized members.)
Church of Melanesia	New Caledonia, Solomon Islands, Vanuatu	200,000	409,000		2016 (Note: The Anglican Church of Melanesia reported 200,000 members in 2006, its last published statistics. According to the 2020 Vanuatu Census, there were 35,923 Anglicans in the country, or 12.02% of the population. In 2019, the United States Department of State published a report on religious freedom in the Solomon Islands. It was estimated that 32% of the country's population was Anglican, or 231,026 people. For this reason, the denomination's own statistics are considered reliable. On the other hand, the book "Growth and Decline in the Anglican Communion: 1980 to the Present," published in 2010, estimated that the church represents approximately 409,000 baptized members.)
Anglican Church of Mexico	Mexico	22,000	30,000	100,000	2016 (Note: The Anglican Church of Mexico claimed to have 100,000 members in 2009. However, an independent survey in 2015 reported that there were only 20,000 Anglicans in the country.)
Anglican Church of Mozambique and Angola	Angola and Mozambique	768,200			2019–2022 (Note: According to the U.S. National Institute of Statistics, in 2022, an estimated 2 percent of Mozambique's population, or 615,600 people, are Anglican. The Diocese of Angola reported that it had 115,000 members in 2019. Therefore, the estimated total membership is 768,200 people.)
Church of the Province of Myanmar	Myanmar	62,000			2016
Church of Nigeria	Nigeria	7,600,000		25,000,000	2010–2025 (Note: The Church of Nigeria claims to have 18,000,000 members. However, in 2010, according to the Pew Research Center, 46% of the population of Nigeria was Christian and 9% of Christians in that country (6,897,240) were Anglicans. According to Andrew (2021), the number of people who self-identify as Anglican and practice would be 7,400,000. Another survey, by the University of Aberdeen, estimated in 2021 that the Church of Nigeria had 22,000,000 in 2015. In 2025, GAFCON reported that the Church of Nigeria had 25 million members.)
Church of North India	Bhutan, India	2,300,000			2025
Church of Pakistan	Pakistan	1,900,000			2020
Anglican Church of Papua New Guinea	Papua New Guinea	233,228			2011 (Note: This province does not publish its own statistics. Data from the latest national census.)
Episcopal Church in the Philippines	Philippines	179,007			2020
Anglican Church of Rwanda	Rwanda	383,904	1,240,000	1,557,000	2004–2017 (Note: The Anglican Rwanda Church claims to have 1,500,000 members in 2025. However, in 2010, according to a report by the Pew Research Center, 93% of the Rwanda population was Christian and 4% of the Christians of this country (383,904) were Anglicans. According to Globethics, the denomination had 1,240,000 members, or 12% of the country's population.)
Scottish Episcopal Church	Scotland	22,990	72,359		2022–2024 (Note: In 2025, according to statistics from the Scottish Episcopal Church itself for the year 2024, the denomination had 22,990 members (16,124 Communicant and 6,866 non-Communicant members). In the 2022 Scottish Census, 72,359 people identified as Anglican, including 45,063 who reported their religion as "Church of England," 15,735 who responded "Scottish Episcopal Church," 5,600 who responded "Episcopalian," 4,161 who responded "Anglican," 1,374 who responded "Church of Ireland" and 426 who responded "Church of Wales".)
Anglican Church of South America	Argentina, Bolivia, Paraguay, Peru, Uruguay	22,500	46,100	53,600	2010–2023 (Note: The Anglican Church of South America reported having only 22,500 members in 2006. On the other hand, the book Growth and decline in the Anglican communion: 1980 to the present, published in 2010, estimated that the church represents about 46,100 baptized members.)
Church of the Province of South East Asia	Brunei, Cambodia, Indonesia, Laos, Malaysia, Nepal, Singapore, Thailand, Vietnam	98,000		224,200	2004–2017 (Note: The Church of the Province of South East Asia estimated that it had 168,079 members in 2005. In 2017, new statistics were released, reporting 98,000 members.)
Church of South India	India, Sri Lanka	5,000,000			2022
Province of the Episcopal Church of South Sudan	South Sudan	5,000,000			2020
Anglican Church of Southern Africa	Eswatini, Lesotho, Namibia, Saint Helena, South Africa	2,931,388	3,007,200	4,000,000	2016
Province of the Episcopal Church of Sudan	Sudan	1,000,000			2014
Anglican Church of Tanzania	Tanzania	2,000,000	3,318,000	4,234,000	2010–2017 (Note: The Anglican Church of Tanzania reported 2,000,000 members in 2006. In 2010, according to a Pew Research Center report, 60% of Tanzania's population was Christian, and 10% of the country's Christians (2,685,600) were Anglicans. This number is higher than that reported by the denomination itself. For this reason, the denomination's own statistics are considered reliable. On the other hand, the book "Growth and Decline in the Anglican Communion: 1980 to the Present," published in 2010, estimated that the church has approximately 3,318,000 baptized members.)
Church of Uganda	Uganda	13,311,801		16,297,000	2024
Episcopal Church	British Virgin Islands, Colombia, Cuba, Dominican Republic, Ecuador, Europe, Guam, Haiti, Honduras, Northern Mariana Islands, Puerto Rico, Taiwan, United States, United States Virgin Islands, Venezuela	1,547,779	2,700,000	2,000,000	2016–2023
Church in Wales	Wales	45,759	709,335	1,100,000	2016–2018
Church of the Province of West Africa	Cameroon, Cape Verde, Gambia, Ghana, Guinea, Liberia, Senegal, Sierra Leone	1,565,000			2020
Church in the Province of the West Indies	Anguilla, Antigua and Barbuda, Aruba, Bahamas, Barbados, Belize, Cayman Islands, Dominica, Grenada, Guyana, Jamaica, Montserrat, Saba, Saint Barthélemy, Saint Kitts and Nevis, Saint Lucia, Saint Martin, Saint Vincent and the Grenadines, Sint Eustatius, Trinidad and Tobago, Turks and Caicos Islands	770,000			2004
Anglican Communion	Global	60,406,830 (Note: Include membership figures for Extraprovincial churches.)	80,223,323	114,491,486	2004–2024

=== Extraprovincial churches ===
In addition to the forty-two provinces, there are five extraprovincial churches under the metropolitical authority of the archbishop of Canterbury.

Provinces	Territorial Jurisdiction	Membership (active members)	Membership (Self-identified members)	Membership (baptized members)	Year
Anglican Church of Bermuda	Bermuda	9,647		14,000	2010–2017
Church of Ceylon	Sri Lanka	50,000		54,200	2006–2017
Parish of the Falkland Islands	Falkland Islands	810			2010–2017
Lusitanian Catholic Apostolic Evangelical Church	Portugal	2,700		5,000	2010–2017
Spanish Reformed Episcopal Church	Spain	5,000		11,900	2010–2017

=== Former provinces ===
Province	Territorial Jurisdiction	Year Established	Year Dissolved
Chung Hua Sheng Kung Hui	China	1912	1949 (1958)
Church of Hawaii	Hawaii	1862	1902
Church of India, Burma and Ceylon	Bangladesh, India, Myanmar, Pakistan, Sri Lanka	1930	1970
Protestant Episcopal Church in the Confederate States of America	Confederate States of America	1861	1865
Province of East Africa	Kenya, Tanzania	1960	1970
United Church of England and Ireland	England, Wales, Ireland	1800	1871

=== New provinces in formation ===
In September 2020, the archbishop of Canterbury announced that he had asked the bishops of the Church of Ceylon to begin planning for the formation of an autonomous province of Ceylon, so as to end his current position as metropolitan of the two dioceses in that country.

In 2023, the Church of the Province of Central Africa approved a plan to subdivide into three new national provinces, so that churches in Malawi, Zambia, and Zimbabwe would become independent of each other, while churches in Botswana could form a fourth national province or be integrated into one of the other three national provinces being formed.

In relation to the Church of the Province of West Africa, it was announced that "the process is in motion for Ghana to become an autonomous province, once it has fulfilled the conditions and guidelines set by the Anglican Communion."

=== Churches in full communion ===
In addition to other member churches, the churches of the Anglican Communion are in full communion with the Old Catholic churches of the Union of Utrecht and the Scandinavian Lutheran churches of the Porvoo Communion in Europe, the India-based Malankara Mar Thoma Syrian and Malabar Independent Syrian churches and the Philippine Independent Church, also known as the Aglipayan Church. The Anglican Communion and Lutheran World Federation have been studying the progress towards full communion between the two bodies, noting that many of their members are already in full communion with one another.

== Historic episcopate ==
The churches of the Anglican Communion have traditionally held that ordination in the historic episcopate is a core element in the validity of clerical ordinations. The Roman Catholic Church, however, does not recognise Anglican orders (see Apostolicae curae). Some Eastern Orthodox churches have issued statements to the effect that Anglican orders could be accepted, yet have reordained former Anglican clergy; other Eastern Orthodox churches have rejected Anglican orders altogether. In 1922, the Ecumenical Patriarch of Constantinople, Meletius IV, issued a statement recognising that Anglican Holy Orders, through apostolic succession, possess the same validity as those of the Roman, Old Catholic, and Armenian Churches. By 1946, five autocephalous Orthodox jurisdictions recognised the validity of Anglican Holy Orders, including Constantinople, Alexandria, Jerusalem, Cyprus, and Romania as well as the autonomous Church of Sinai. This recognition, however, was conditional because from an Eastern Orthodox standpoint, no Holy Orders outside of their church could truly be valid without a complete church reunion. The Church of Greece also recognised the validity of Anglican Orders in 1939, albeit "by economy" or "as an indulgence"; these recognitions have "not been rescinded". However, in 1948, the Russian Orthodox Church responded that it would not recognise Anglican Orders unless recognition was given by a council of autocephalous Orthodox churches. Orthodox bishop Kallistos Ware explains this apparent discrepancy as follows:

Anglican clergy who join the Orthodox Church are reordained; but [some Orthodox churches hold that] if Anglicanism and Orthodoxy were to reach full unity in the faith, perhaps such reordination might not be found necessary. It should be added, however, that a number of individual Orthodox theologians hold that under no circumstances would it be possible to recognise the validity of Anglican Orders.

== See also ==
- Acts of Supremacy
- English Reformation
- Dissolution of the Monasteries
- Ritualism in the Church of England
- Apostolicae curae
- Affirming Catholicism
- Anglican ministry
- Anglo-Catholicism
- British Israelism
- Church Society
- Church's Ministry Among Jewish People
- Compass rose
- Evangelical Anglicanism
- Flag of the Anglican Communion
- Liberal Anglo-Catholicism
- List of the largest Protestant bodies
- Reform (Anglican)
- Anglican Use

== Notes ==
Subnotes
