= Cathedral Hill, Lusaka =

Cathedral Hill
- City neighborhood
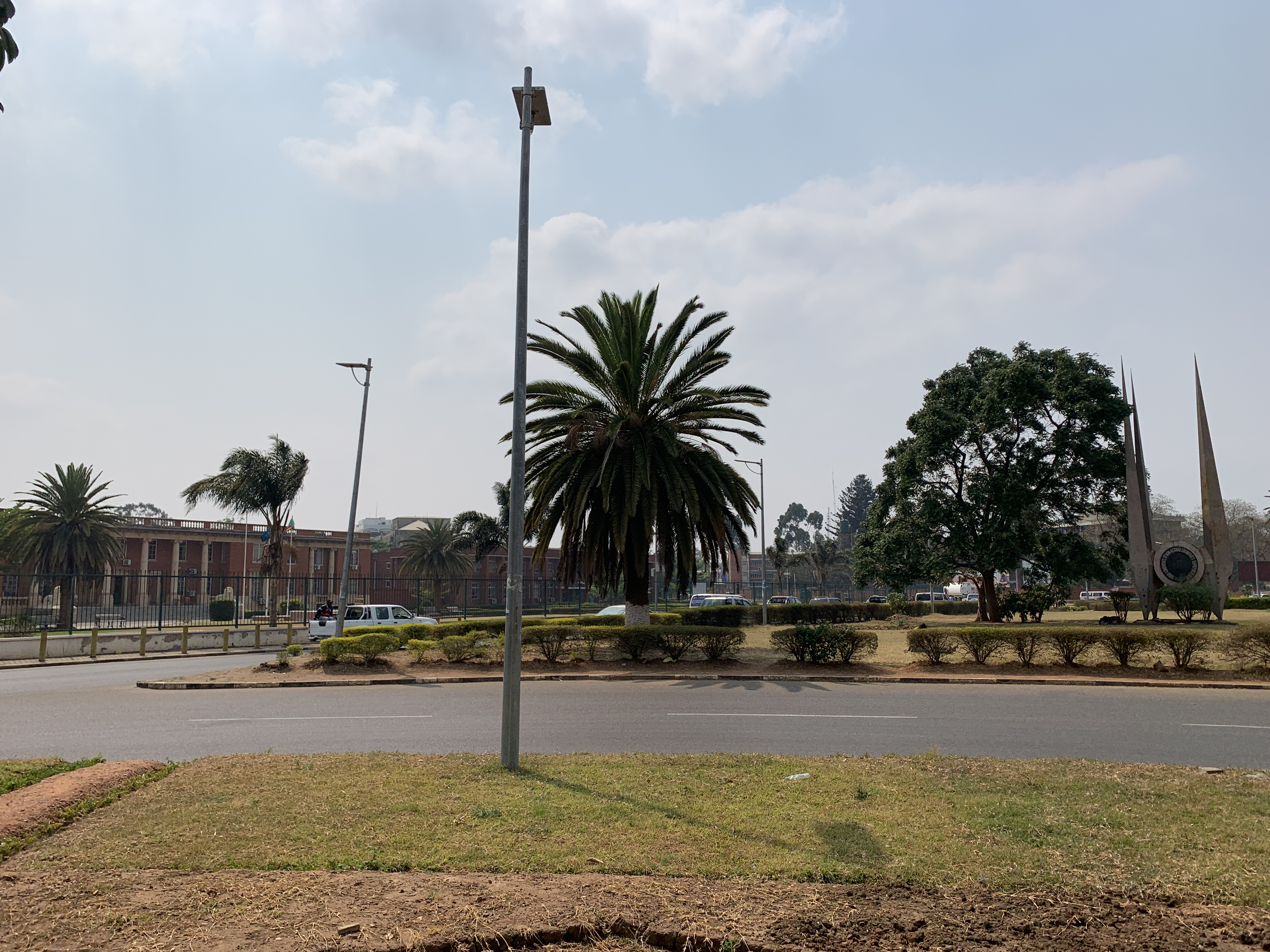

- Location in Zambia
- Coordinates: 15°25′17″S 28°18′35″E
- Country: Zambia
- Province: Lusaka

Cathedral Hill is a neighbourhood in the city of Lusaka, the capital of Zambia.

== Location ==
The neighbourhood is bordered by Independence Avenue to the south and Cairo Road (T2) to the west. Church Road, Addis Ababa Road and Los Angeles Boulevard form the northern boundary of the neighbourhood. The eastern boundary in marked by Leopards Hill Road and Chindo Road. The coordinates of the neighbourhood are 15°25'17.0"S, 28°18'35.0"E (Latitude:-15.421391; Longitude:28.309716).

== Overview ==
The neighbourhood houses important national buildings, hotels, embassies, houses of worship, and businesses, including the following:

- Supreme Court of Zambia
- High Court of Zambia
- Lusaka Central Railway Station
- Lusaka Inter-City Bus Terminus
- Lusaka National Museum
- State House
- Headquarters of Zambia Development Agency
- High commission of Malawi to Zambia
- Cathedral of the Holy Cross (Anglican), seat of the Diocese of Lusaka
- Headquarters of the Examinations Council of Zambia
- Zambian Italian Orthopedic Hospital

== See also ==
- Chelston
- Garden Township, Lusaka
- Matero, Lusaka
- Ridgeway, Lusaka
