= Ridgeway, Lusaka =

Ridgeway
- City neighborhood
- Location in Zambia15°26'05.0"S 28°19'14.0"E
- Coordinates: 15°26′05″S 28°19′14″E
- Country: Zambia
- Province: Lusaka

Ridgeway is a neighborhood in the city of Lusaka, the capital of Zambia.

== Location ==
The neighborhood is bordered by Independence Avenue to the north, Chitukuko Road to the east, Burma Road to the south and Nationalist Road to the west. The coordinates of the neighborhood are 15°26'05.0"S, 28°19'14.0"E (Latitude:-15.434736; Longitude:28.320553).

== Overview ==
The neighborhood houses the following national institutions and buildings, among others:

- The teaching hospital of the University of Zambia School of Medicine
- Arakan Barracks, a unit of the Zambian Defence Force and the headquarters of the Zambia Army.
- National Archives of Zambia
- University of Zambia - School of Medicine Ridgeway Campus
- Central Statistics Office
- Mukobeko Prisons
- UTH Club
- Cancer Disease Center (CDC)
- Ridgeway Pharmacy
- Hanbet Pharmacy

== See also ==
- Chelston
- Cathedral Hill
- Garden Township
- Matero
- Kabwata
