= National Archives of Zambia =

Archive of Zambia

- Interactive map of National Archives of Zambia
- 15.426400600880552°S 28.310979145170183°E
- Location: Lusaka, Zambia

The National Archives of Zambia preserve the archives of the Republic of Zambia and maintain its legal deposit library. The library holds 70,000 volumes. (Note: According to the United Nations, as of 2010 approximately 83 percent of adult Zambians are literate.) Its headquarters are located in Ridgeway in the city of Lusaka.

== Mission statement ==
To effectively manage and preserve public records, archives, printed and non-printed publications in order to facilitate lawful access to this information to all stakeholders, thereby promoting efficiency and effective government administration.

== Mandate ==
- To provide for the preservation, custody, control and disposal of public archives including public records of Zambia;
- Registration of newspapers;
- To provide for the printing and publication of books; and
- The preservation of printed works published in Zambia.

== The Role ==
The role of the National Archives will be to provide an efficient and effective records management system and safe custody of all public records, archives and printed and non-printed publications in order to ensure lawful access to information by government institutions and the general public.”

== See also ==
- List of national archives

== Bibliography ==
- P.M. Mukula (1988), "Role of the National Archives" (PDF), National Seminar on National Information Policy for Zambia, Paris: Unesco
- Herbert Kopa Nyendwa (1989). "National Legal Deposit Library of Zambia". In Allen Kent (ed.). Encyclopedia of Library and Information Science. Vol. 44. New York: Marcel Dekker. ISBN 9780824720445. (Part of the National Archives)
- K. Kashweka (2008). "Archival legislation and the management of public records in Sub-Saharan Africa: the case of the National Archives Act of Zambia". Zambia Library Association Journal. 23. ISSN 0049-853X.
- C Hamooya, B Njobvu (2010). "Digitization of archival materials: The case of national archives of Zambia". ESARBICA Journal. 29. Eastern and Southern Africa Regional Branch of the International Council on Archives. doi:10.4314/esarjo.v29i1.64299. ISSN 0376-4753.
- C Hamooya, F Mulauzi, B Njobvu (2011). "Archival legislation and the management of public sector Records in Zambia: a critical review". Journal of the South African Society of Archivists. 44 – via African Journals OnLine.
- Miles Larmer; Marja Hinfelaar (2012), Historians as Archivists in Post-colonial Zambia. Abstract. Paper presented at conference in Senegal "Archives of Post-Independence Africa and its Diaspora" (Includes information on National Archives)
