= Trevor Mumba =

Zambian Entrepreneur

- Born: March 30, 1983 (age 42); Matero, Lusaka, Zambia
- Occupations: Entrepreneur, Media Personality
- Years active: 2014 - Present
- Children: 1

Trevor Mumba (born, 30 March 1983) is a Zambian businessman and radio personality based in South Africa. He owns Rovert Radio for which he won the Zambian radio personality in 2023. Prior to that, in September 2022, he was nominated for the Diamond TV Personality Awards and won the 2022 Medium Enterprise Owner of the year Award, where he was placed in the same category as renowned Zambian businesswoman Monica Musonda.

== Radio and media personality ==
Mumba is the founder and director of Rovert Radio, Rovert Marketing, Rovert Investments Zambia Limited which specializes in media, cattle ranching, sports and logistics.

In 2022, he won the Zambian Personality Award for Medium Enterprise Owner of the Year at the Diamond Television Awards.

== Personal life ==
Mumba lives in Johannesburg, South Africa. He is married and has one child. In 2023, he announced his intention to contest for a Parliamentary seat in Matero for the 2026 Zambian general election. Mumba is also a former SA Fashion Week stylist and owner of a fashion brand called KiloGram.
