= Matero =

Matero may refer to

- Matero, Lusaka, a neighborhood in Zambia's capital city of Lusaka
- Matero (constituency), a parliamentary constituency in Zambia covering the eponymous Lusaka suburb
- Matero Magic, a basketball team from the Matero suburb of Lusaka
