= Chilufya =

Chilufya is both a given name and a surname of Zambian origin. Notable people with this name include:

== Given name ==
- Chilufya Tayali, Zambian politician

== Surname ==
- Chitalu Chilufya (born 1972), Zambian politician
- Edward Chilufya (born 1999), Zambian footballer
- Prisca Chilufya (born 1999), Zambian footballer
- William Chilufya (born 1983), Zambian footballer
