= Ba Matero =

Zambian actor, comedian, and boxer (born 2000)

- Born: Francis Nundwe; April 2, 2000 (age 26); Matero, Zambia

Comedy career
- Years active: 2021 ― Present
- Medium: Facebook and TikTok

Francis Nundwe (born April 2, 2000) is a Zambian actor, comedian, performer and former boxer professionally known as Ba Matero. He is best known for his distinctive comedy style that involves mimicking and acting out everyday suburban scenarios, particularly petty thieving in the Lusaka suburb of Matero. His skits often feature an accompanying song, Nalitumpa Ine by 4 na 5 featuring Slap Dee, which has helped contribute to his unique appeal and growing popularity. He is also the Zamtel Social Media Awards Content Creator of the Year for 2025.

== Early life, education and career ==
Francis Nundwe was born and raised in Matero, Lusaka. He attended primary school in Matero, continued to New Matero Secondary School for grades 10 and 11, and completed grade 12 at Libala Secondary School in 2019. He is the fourth child of Bishop John General, a well-known Lusaka preacher. Ba Matero's interest in comedy dates back to his school days but only gained significant traction after posting comedy skits on social media over the course of four months, leading to a rapid rise in popularity with thousands of followers. His comedy style is non-verbal and heavily inspired by British comedian Rowan Atkinson, best known as Mr. Bean, focusing on physical expressions rather than stand-up or musical performances common in Zambia. Ba Matero jokingly refers to his character as coming from "Matero University of Thieving," playfully highlighting his focus on petty theft themes in his comedy. Apart from comedy, Ba Matero is also a boxer. He won a gold medal representing the national team through Exodus Boxing Academy and is known in boxing circles as "Kappa." He manages his father's media team at Healing Center Television when not producing comedy content.

== Personal life ==
His father was opposed to his comedic career. However, Bishop John General is now one of his biggest supporters.
