= FINDECO House =

Skyscraper in Lusaka, Zambia

- FINDECO House

General information
- Architectural style: Yugoslav Modernism
- Location: Lusaka, Zambia
- Coordinates: 15.4243°S 28.2838°E

Height
- Height: 295 ft (90 m)

Technical details
- Floor count: 23 floors

Design and construction
- Architects: Dušan Milenković & Branimir Ganović
- Main contractor: ZECCO

FINDECO House is a skyscraper in Lusaka, Zambia, and was the tallest building in Zambia until the completion of the Pyramid Tower. Situated at the junction of Independence Avenue and Cairo Road in the heart of the city's Central Business District, the 295-feet building was built between 1978 and 1979 following the design of Yugoslav architects Dušan Milenković and Branimir Ganović. The building is named after parastatal corporation FINDECO (State Finance and Development Corporation) that was the initial owner of the building. The building currently houses both office and retail spaces and is currently under the management of the National Housing Authority. An enormous sign displaying the logo of Samsung was installed atop the building in 2013.
