= Cathedral of the Holy Cross, Lusaka =

Anglican cathedral in Lusaka, Zambia

Coordinates: 15.4188°S 28.3037°E

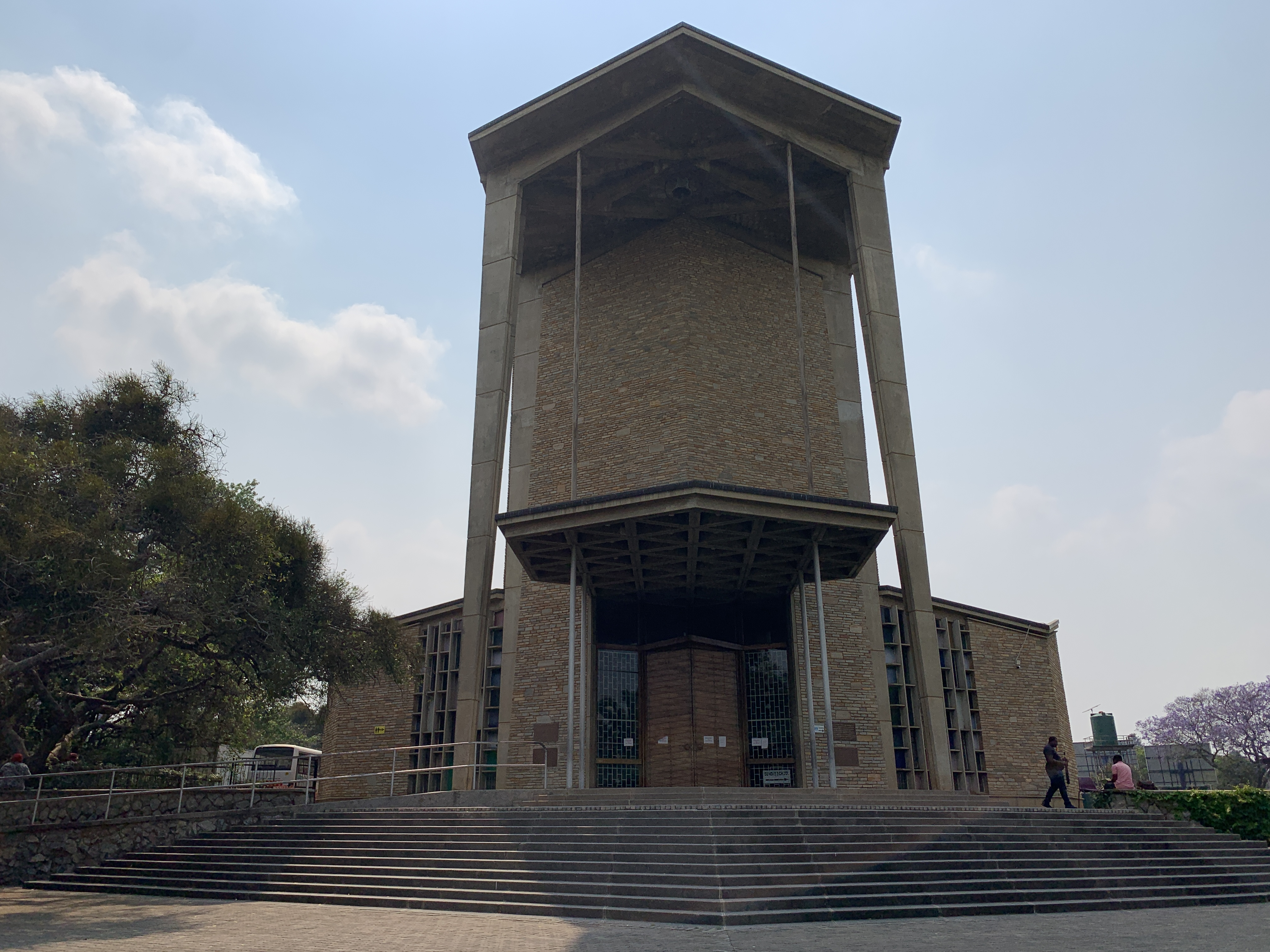
Exterior view, September 2021

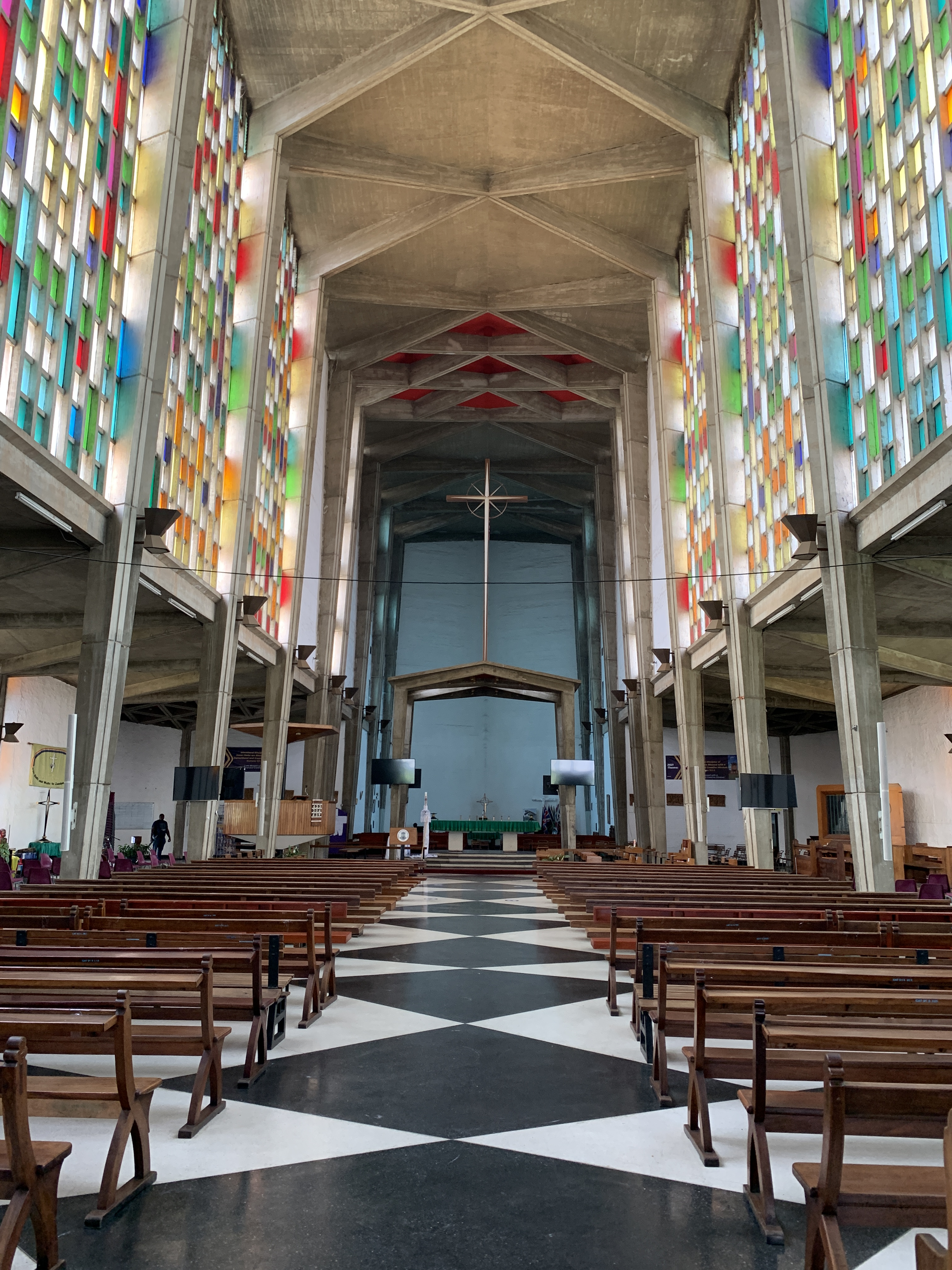
Interior view, September 2021

The Cathedral of the Holy Cross is an Anglican cathedral located in the Cathedral Hill neighbourhood of Lusaka, Zambia, and the seat and mother church of the Diocese of Lusaka. The cathedral was constructed in 1962.
