= Lukundo Nalungwe =

Zambian model

Lukundo Nalungwe (born c. 1987) is a Zambian model who was crowned "Face of Africa" in February 2010, the first Zambian to receive the award. She won $50,000, a contract with O Model Africa and a trip to the New York Fashion Week. President Rupiah Banda of Zambia passed on his congratulations, saying the achievement brought "pride to Zambia".

== Biography ==
Nalungwe grew up in Lusaka and is currently studying for a diploma in Business Administration, saying that despite having won the Face of Africa crown she will not be halting her studies. Nalungwe works as a model, and she had applied for the Face of Africa award three times before winning on her fourth attempt.

She won the Face of Africa award in February 2010, having bested 400 other entrants. On winning the award Nalungwe commented that she was honored to have won, and that she was grateful to everyone who had helped her. She was also praised by the President of Zambia, Rupiah Banda, who said that the achievement brought "pride to Zambia".

The award was $50,000, a contract with O Model Africa and a trip to the New York Fashion Week.
