= Southern Africa Freedom Trail =

The Southern Africa Freedom Trail is a route running through Lusaka, Zambia that leads to a number of historic sites significant to the region's anti-colonial and anti-apartheid struggles.

For nearly 30 years leaders of nationalist movements from various Southern African countries used Lusaka, Zambia as a base for their respective campaigns. Leaders from South Africa, including Oliver Tambo and future presidents Thabo Mbeki and Jacob Zuma held offices in Lusaka. In addition, insurgents from Zimbabwe, Namibia and Mozambique were based out of Lusaka. As a result, Lusaka was the site for numerous significant meetings and policy changes, but it also became the site of raids and assassinations targeting these organisations. The Southern Africa Freedom Trail directs followers to these historic, yet often unmarked, locations.

Some of the locations on the trail include the African National Congress (ANC) Headquarters where Oliver Tambo maintained his office and the African Liberation Centre headed by Edward Nkoloso, who also became well known for his attempt at building a Zambian space program. Other locations include the Mulungushi International Conference Centre, the site where the ANC elected Nelson Mandela as the deputy president of the party, as well as the assassination site of Herbert Chitepo, leader of the Zimbabwe African National Union, and the attempted assassination site of Joshua Nkomo, leader of the Zimbabwe African People's Union.

The Southern Africa Freedom Trail was created by the Lusaka Global Shapers, an initiative of the World Economic Forum, in 2014, with Matthew Grollnek and Patience Chisanga leading the project.
