= Parklands High School, Lusaka =

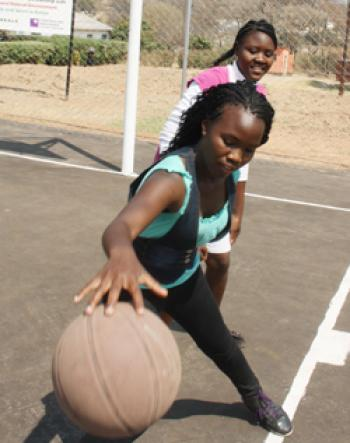
Pupils at Parklands High School playing basketball at the newly opened sporting facility

Parklands High School is a small high school in the southern part of Lusaka in Chilanga constituency of Zambia. The school's motto is "Narrow path is the way" which is literally based on Bible principles. The school is about 12 kilometers away from the heart of Lusaka, about 2 kilometers away from the well known Munda Wanga Zoo, and about 4 kilometers away from the Lafarge factory. The school offers secondary school education to people who live in Chilanga and nearby.

== History ==
The school was initially set up by Chilanga Cement (currently Lafarge Cement plc) in the 1940s. It was later handed over to the government. Under government control the school began to offer grade one to nine education. In 1998, it stopped offering primary education and became a secondary school, offering only grades eight up to grade twelve. In 2005, it stopped offering grade eight and nine education services; with this in mind, it became a high school in 2006, offering only grade ten to twelve education.

The school was headed for 16 years by one headteacher who in 2008 retired and was replaced by another one.

== Daily routine ==
Since the school is a day-scholars' school, the pupils come in the morning for classes, and in the afternoon they have sporting activities and club activities.

== Exam results ==
The school has a good pass mark rate record, which has seen a lot of the pupils who have attended this school go to the main University of Zambia, Copperbelt University, National Institutes for Public Administration (NIPA), Natural Resources Development College (NRDC), Mulungushi University and other institutions of higher learning.

== Former pupils ==
Former Parklands High School Association

The former pupils of Parklands High School in 2010 came together and established the Former Parklands High School Association (FOPASA), which also includes some staff of the school. The association started out as a Facebook page but later on grew out and came to the concert of the school and now it is registered with the school. The association consists of past pupils of Parklands High School who are working and also those who in higher institutions of learning.

The aim of the association is to connect the former pupils of the school and also to see to it that former pupils add back to the school through different means.
