= Lusaka City Airport =

- IATA: none; ICAO: FLLC

Summary
- Airport type: Military
- Serves: Lusaka
- Elevation AMSL: 4,200 ft (1,300 m)
- Coordinates: 15°24′50″S 28°19′50″E

Map
- Location in Zambia

Runways
Direction	Length		Surface
Direction	m	ft	Surface
08/26	2,010	6,594	Asphalt
- Sources: WAD GCM Google Maps

Lusaka City Airport (ICAO: FLLC) is a military airport serving Lusaka, Zambia. It is used by the Zambian Air Force and the government, while international and commercial traffic is served by Kenneth Kaunda International Airport.

Runway 08 has an unusual 360 metres (1,181 ft) displaced threshold (no touchdown section), located 310 metres (1,017 ft) past the normal threshold.

The Lusaka VOR-DME (Ident: VLS) is located 7.3 nautical miles (8.4 mi; 13.5 km) northeast of the airport. There are numerous non-directional beacons in the area associated with approaches to the nearby international airport.

== See also ==
- Transport in Zambia
- List of airports in Zambia
