= Sun Share Tower =

Skyscraper in Lusaka, Zambia

Sun Share Tower is a skyscraper in Lusaka, Zambia, and is the country's second tallest building, at 190 feet (58 m) tall. It is Lusaka's most modern skyscraper; construction ended in 2016. The Tower is owned by Sun Share Investment, a Chinese-affiliated company.
