= Chilufya Tayali =

Zambian politician

President of the Economic and Equity Party
- Incumbent
- Assumed office 2018

Personal details
- Born: Zambia
- Party: Economic and Equity Party

Chilufya Tayali is a Zambian politician and President of Economic and Equity Party, an opposition political party in Zambia. Previously, he was leader of civil society before joining active politics when he contested to be Mayor of Lusaka, the capital of Zambia.

== Politics ==
Tayali has been an active advocate of human rights and a controversial figure in Zambian politics, often involved in political tussles with fellow politicians. He formed his own political party, Economic and Equity Party in 2017 arguing that Zambia needed fresh blood. He has been an ally of former Zambian president Edgar Lungu until 2023 after the former president decided to re-join active politics. Tayali argued that he cannot support Lungu because the ex-Zambian leader was not spirited enough to fight current Zambian President Hakainde Hichilema.

In April 2024, it was announced that Tayali was on Interpol's wanted persons list. He had been issued two bench warrants and was missing for three months.
