= Chelston =

Chelston Chakunkula Chelstone
- Location in Zambia
- Coordinates: 15°21′57″S 28°23′07″E
- Country: Zambia
- Province: Lusaka

Chelston, also Chelstone or Chakunkula, is a neighborhood in Zambia's capital city, Lusaka. Before the 1960s Chelston was a separate town until it was annexed into the greater city of Lusaka.

== Location ==
Chelston is on the Great East Road, approximately 13 kilometres (8 mi), by road, northeast of downtown Lusaka. To Chelston's west are the neighbourhoods of Munali and Kamanga. To the south is the Great East Road and across it is the neighbourhood of Avondale. To the east is the Airport Road, leading to Kenneth Kaunda International Airport (KKIA). To the north is the swamp that lies west of KKIA. The geographical coordinates of Chelston are: 15°21'57.0"S, 28°23'07.0"E (Latitude:-15.365823; Longitude:28.385265).

== Overview ==
Chelston is a high-class residential neighbourhood. The predominant residences are single family homes for civil servants.

== See also ==
- Lusaka
