= Matero, Lusaka =

Township of Lusaka, Zambia

Matero
- Neighborhood
- Location in Zambia
- Coordinates: 15°22′33″S 28°15′47″E
- Country: Zambia
- Province: Lusaka Province
- Constituency: Matero Constituency
- Main Place: Lusaka

Matero is a township in the north-western part of the city of Lusaka in Zambia.

== Location ==
The neighborhood is bordered to the northeast by the T2 road (Great North Road), that stretches between Kabwe to the north, through Lusaka to Kafue to the south. To the southeast, the border is Lumumba Road. Umuzilikazi Road marks the neighborhood's southern border. The western border is the river that starts near the southern end of Chitanda Road and flows northwestwards until it crosses the same street near the Chitanda Sewerage pond. The northern border of Matero stretches from the Chitanda pond to the west, through Chitanda Cemetery, to end at the T2 highway, immediately north of National Heroes Stadium. The coordinates of Matero are 15°22'33.0"S, 28°15'47.0"E (Latitude: -15.375823; Longitude:28.263054).

== Notable people ==
- Ba Matero
- Miles Sampa
- Trevor Mumba

== See also ==
- Lusaka
