= Sri Aman =

Sri Aman may refer to:

- Simanggang, former name of the town from 1974 until 2019
- Sri Aman District, a district in Sarawak
- Sri Aman Division, an administrative division in Sarawak
- Sri Aman (federal constituency), a federal constituency represented in the Dewan Rakyat
- Sri Aman (state constituency), a former state constituency in Sarawak. See List of Malaysian State Assembly Representatives (1986–90).
