= Batang Lupar 1 Bridge =

- Coordinates: 1°30′49.3″N 110°58′37.3″E
- Carries: 2 traffic lanes (JKR R5 standard)
- Crosses: Batang Lupar (Lupar River)
- Locale: Sarawak, Malaysia
- Begins: Sebuyau, Samarahan Division
- Ends: Triso (Maludam), Betong Division
- Official name: Jambatan Batang Lupar 1
- Other name: King of Bridges
- Named for: Lupar River
- Owner: Government of Sarawak
- Maintained by: Public Works Department Sarawak
- Heritage status: Recognised by the Malaysia Book of Records (longest bridge crossing a river in Malaysia)

Characteristics
- Design: Cable-stayed bridge
- Material: Composite concrete and high-strength structural steel
- Total length: 4.844 km (4,844 m)
- Height: 108 m (pylon height)
- Water depth: 90 m (pile foundation depth)
- Traversable?: Yes
- Longest span: 598.8 m
- Piers in water: 87
- Clearance below: 26 m (navigational clearance)
- No. of lanes: 2 lanes (single carriageway)

History
- Engineering design by: HSS / Hewson Consulting
- Constructed by: Perbena Emas Sdn Bhd / China Railway Major Bridge Engineering Group
- Built: 2021–2026
- Construction start: 2021
- Construction end: May 2026
- Construction cost: RM848,745,087.50 (fully funded by the Government of Sarawak)
- Opened: 21 May 2026
- Inaugurated: 21 May 2026 (pre-opening); 9 July 2026 (official opening)
- Replaces: Batang Lupar ferry service (Triso ferry)

Statistics
- Toll: Toll-free

Location
- Interactive map of Batang Lupar 1 Bridge

The Batang Lupar 1 Bridge (Malay: Jambatan Batang Lupar 1) is a two-lane, one-way bridge crossing the Lupar River in Sarawak, Malaysia. It connects Sebuyau with Maludam (Triso). With a total length of 4.884 km (3.035 mi), it is currently the longest river bridge in Malaysia. The RM848 million project was fully funded by the government of Sarawak. Due to its length and scale, the bridge is commonly referred to as the "King of Bridges". The bridge was constructed to JKR R5 standards and is supported by 87 bridge piers. Its main structure is a cable-stayed bridge with a length of 598.8 m (1,965 ft). The bridge provides a ship navigation clearance of 26 m (85 ft) in height and 250 m (820 ft) in width. The bridge was opened to the public on 21 May 2026. Its opening ended the Batang Lupar (Triso) ferry service, which had previously operated at the crossing. The bridge now provides a direct road connection along the Sebuyau–Triso coastal corridor, eliminating the need for vehicles to use the ferry service.

== History and construction ==
Construction of the bridge is a key component of the Sarawak government's Coastal Road Network and Second Trunk Road plan, aiming to stimulate sustainable socioeconomic growth and commercial activities in the coastal region. The construction contract was awarded to the local firm Perbena Emas Sdn Bhd in partnership with China Railway Major Bridge Engineering Group Co. Ltd (MBEC), a subsidiary of the China Railway Engineering Group (CREC).

The project, which costs approximately RM848.7 million, reached a major milestone on 26 January 2026 when the main structure connection work was successfully completed. The structural connection ceremony was officiated by the Deputy Minister for Infrastructure and Port Development, Datuk Ir. Aidel bin Lariwoo, alongside JKR Sarawak Director Datu Dr. Cassidy Morris. The bridge engineering also utilises specialised bearings and expansion joints provided by the Mageba Group. The opening ceremony of the bridge was officiated by the Deputy Premier of Sarawak, Datuk Amar Douglas Uggah Embas on 21 May 2026, while the long-operating Sebuyau-Triso ferry service was completely terminated on the next day, 22 May 2026. The opening of the bridge shortened the travel time across the river to around 5 minutes compared to the previous ferry service which often took between 30 and 45 minutes, and is expected to stimulate the growth of agriculture, tourism and local resource development sectors.
