= Sebuyau District =

Sebuyau
- District of Malaysia

- Seal

- Location within Sarawak Location within Malaysia Location within Southeast Asia
- Coordinates: 1°31′30″N 110°55′45″E
- Country: Malaysia
- State: Sarawak
- Division: Samarahan Division
- Seat: Sebuyau

Area
  - Total: 625.07 km^{2} (241.34 sq mi)
- Time zone: UTC+8 (MST)

Sebuyau District is a district in the state of Sarawak. This district is part of Samarahan Division, which includes the districts of Samarahan, Simunjan, Asajaya, Gedong, and Sebuyau itself. The administrative center for this district is Sebuyau Town. Sebuyau was previously a sub-district located under the administration of the Simunjan District.

== Etymology ==
Sebuyau District gets its name from the word "buyo," which originates from the Melanau language and literally translates to "crab." In the past, there was an abundance of crabs in the Sebuyau area.

== History ==
Before being elevated to a full district, Sebuyau District was only a sub-district located under the jurisdiction of Simunjan District.

In 2021, this district was established along with four other districts, namely Siburan, Gedong, Pantu, and Lingga, as new districts to streamline the administration of the state of Sarawak. This decision was announced by Abang Johari Abang Openg as the Premier of Sarawak during the Gedong District launching ceremony.

== Geography ==
Sebuyau District is located in a coastal area. Almost all the towns under the supervision of the Sebuyau Sub-district are situated along the coast. It borders Lingga to the southeast, Isu and Pantu to the south, Simunjan to the southwest, and Asajaya and Sebangan to the west. The district also faces the South China Sea to its north. The district has an area of approximately 625.07 square kilometers. Among the physical geographical features found here are Batang Lupar, Batang Sadong, and Sebuyau River.

== Demographics ==
Total population of every areas in Sebuyau District, Sarawak. These population are exactly based on their ethnics in Sarawak.

Malay is the only ethnic that mostly available in Sebuyau District area, along with other ethnics such as Chinese, Iban, Bidayuh, and Melanau.

1. Pekan Sebuyau

- Malay : 16,373
- Chinese : 209
- Iban : 98
- Melanau : 15
- Bidayuh : 10
- Orang Ulu : –
- Indian : –
- Other ethnics : –

TOTAL : 16,705

2. Sebangan & Tebelu

- Malay : 5,791
- Chinese : 34
- Iban : 11
- Melanau : –
- Bidayuh : –
- Orang Ulu : –
- Indian : –
- Other ethnics : –

TOTAL : 5,836

3. Gedong

- Malay : 19,487
- Iban : 5,903
- Chinese : 730
- Bidayuh : 41
- Melanau : 12
- Orang Ulu : –
- Indian : –
- Other ethnics : –

TOTAL : 26,173

4. Simunjan

- Malay : 18,196
- Iban : 9,577
- Chinese : 1,051
- Melanau : 30
- Bidayuh : 16
- Orang Ulu : –
- Indian : –
- Other ethnics : –

TOTAL : 28,870

5. Kampung Teriso (Triso)

- Malay : 2,384
- Melanau : 103
- Iban : 21
- Chinese : –
- Bidayuh : –
- Orang Ulu : –
- Indian : –
- Other ethnics : –

TOTAL : 2,508

== Administration ==
Sebuyau District is entirely administered by the Sebuyau District Office. Among the significant towns within this administrative area are Sebuyau Town, Sebangan, and Tebelu.

It is also divided into 78 villages, where each village has a community leader. Among the villages under the Sebuyau District are Kampung Plaie Atas, Kampung Plaie Baroh, Kampung Raba, Kampung Selangking, Kampung Lunying, Kampung Sagu, Kampung Arus Melayu, Kampung Seruyuk, Kampung Tungkah Dayak, Kampung Tungkah Melayu, Kampung Bulan, Kampung Bulan Baru, Sungai Rama, Kampung Nap, Bajong Tengah, Bajong Hulu, Entanggor, Stika, Bajong, Bajong Hilir, and others.

The district is led by a District Officer (DO), currently being Mr. Ayuradiman bin Bujan.

== Facilities ==
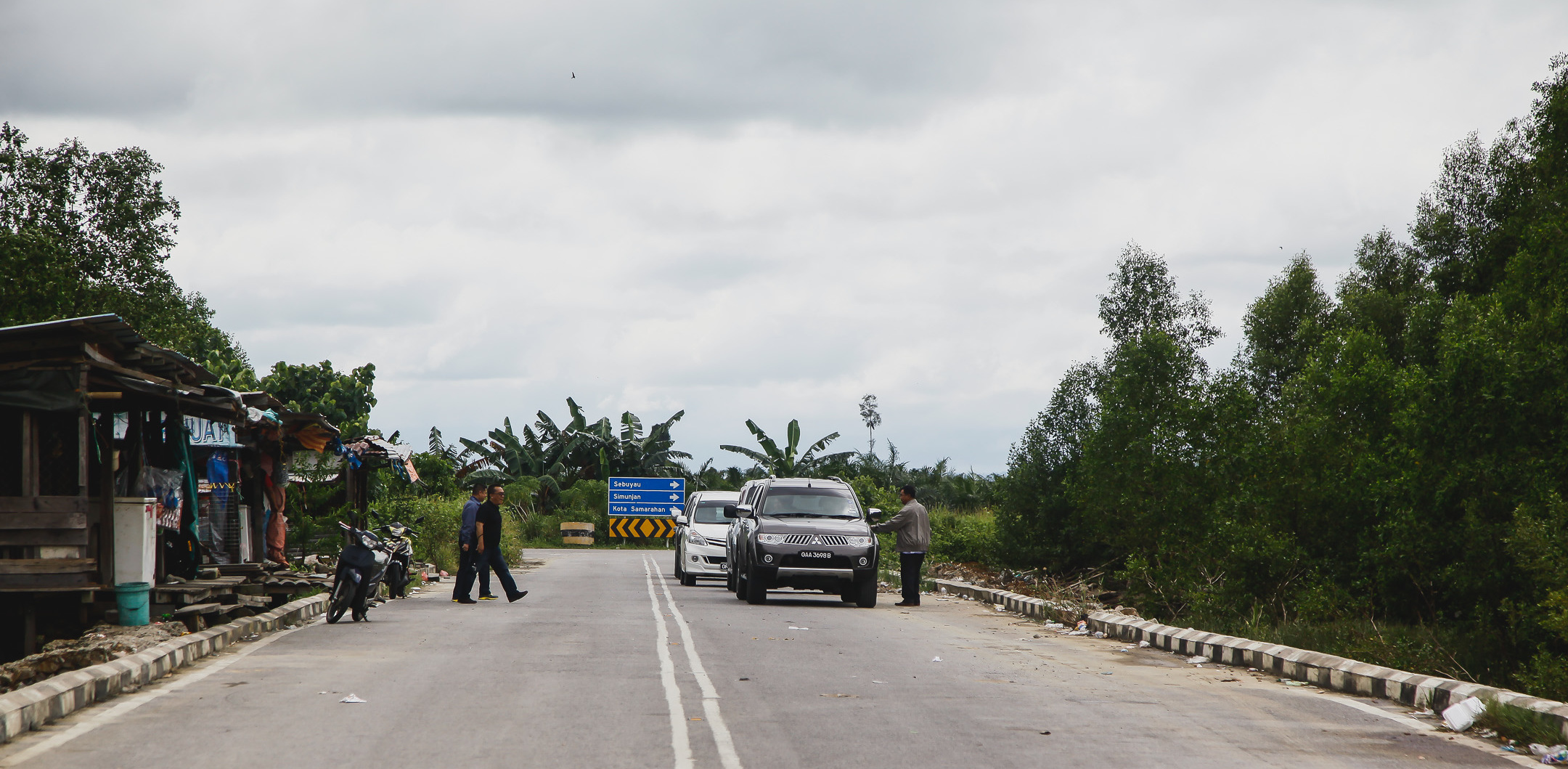
Road towards Sebuyau Town.

Sebuyau District has various public facilities. It possesses one secondary school, Sekolah Menengah Kebangsaan Sebuyau, 16 primary schools, and two national-type schools. Road facilities are very good in Sebuyau, connecting all the major cities in Sarawak.

Batang Lupar 1 Bridge is a latest road bridge that connected between Sebuyau and Kampung Teriso (Triso). With a total length of 4.884 km (3.035 mi), it is currently the longest river bridge in Malaysia.

== See also ==
- Sebuyau
- Serian
- Batu Kawah
- Padawan
- Bau
- Lundu
- Sri Aman
