= St. Paul's Anglican Church, Lingga =

St. Paul's Anglican Church
- Malay: Gereja Anglikan St. Paul
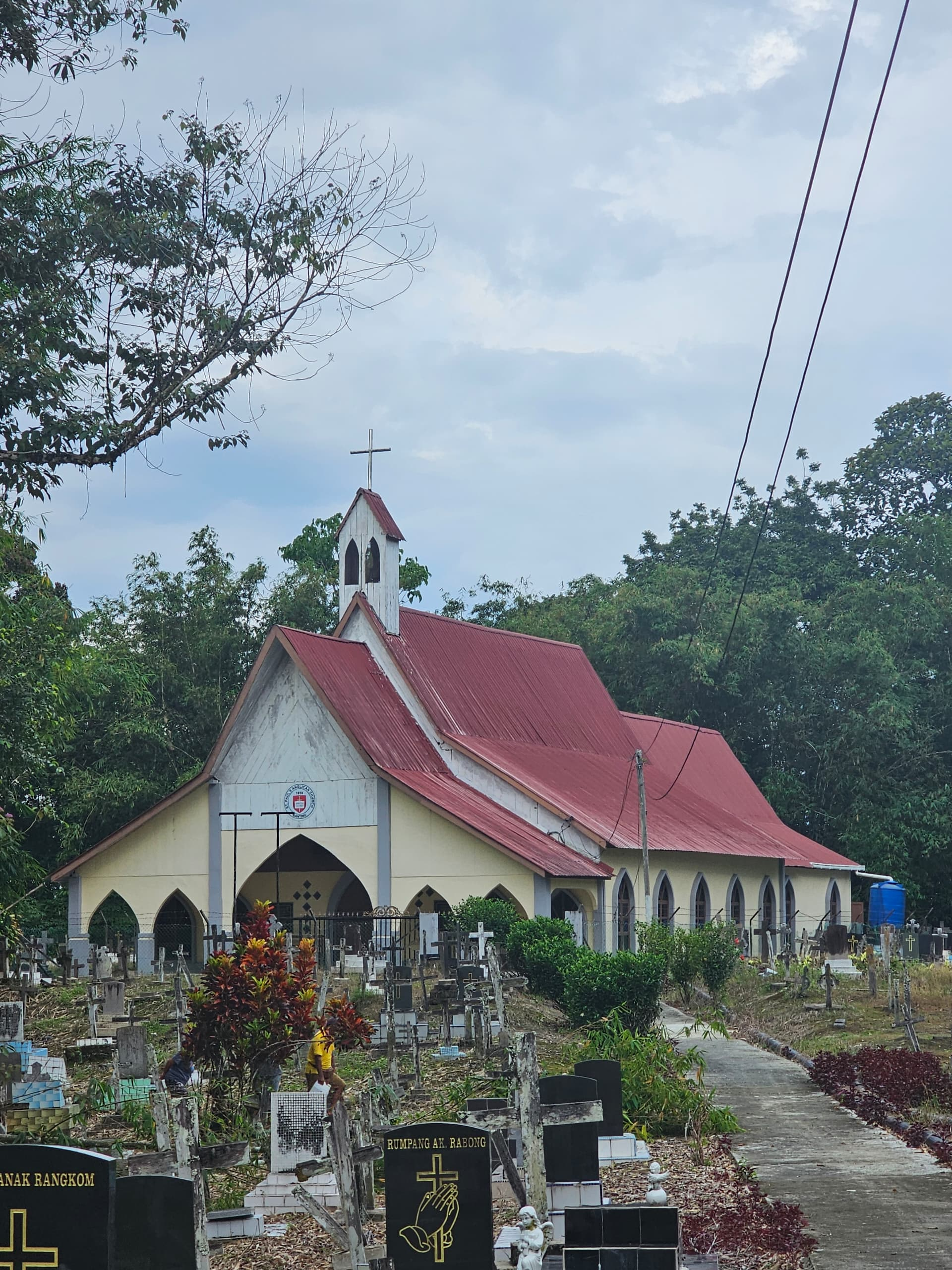
- Front entrance of St. Paul's Anglican Church, Lingga
- St. Paul's Anglican Church
- 1°17′1.60868″N 111°12′29.70540″E
- Location: Banting, Lingga, Sri Aman Division, Sarawak
- Country: Malaysia
- Denomination: Anglican

History
- Status: Parish Church
- Founded: 1859
- Dedication: St. Paul
- Consecrated: 1864

Architecture
- Years built: 1857

Administration
- Diocese: Kuching

St. Paul's Anglican Church (Malay: Gereja Anglikan St. Paul) or simply called St. Paul's Church is an Anglican church in Banting, Lingga, Sri Aman Division, Sarawak, Malaysia. It is considered one of the oldest church in the state since it was completed at 1859.

== History ==
As a part of effort to evanglise the Dayak people in Sarawak, Rev. Walter Chambers began ministering in Lingga after ministering in a place which was called Sakarran. After the Christian community in Lingga grew, the construction of the church began in 1857. This church was completed in 1859 and was consecrated by Bishop Francis McDougall in 1864. The church was built with belian wood.

According to Harriette McDougall's record, from this church, the Banting Mission has expanded into seven stations, where there are school churches built by the natives themselves and many hundreds of Christian worshippers.

== Gazettement ==
This building was proposed to be gazetted as a heritage site since it was eligible for consideration as Class 2 heritage under Sarawak Heritage Ordinance 2019.
