= Jalan Sri Aman =

Road in Malaysia

Route information
- Length: 8 km (5.0 mi)

Major junctions
- North end: Sri Aman
- FT 1 AH150 Pan Borneo Highway
- South end: Temudok

Location
- Country: Malaysia
- Primary destinations: Simanggang

Highway system
- Highways in Malaysia; Expressways; Federal; State

Jalan Sri Aman, or Jalan Akses Sri Aman, Federal Route 2105, is a federal road in Sri Aman Division, Sarawak, Malaysia. It is also a main route to Sri Aman town from Pan Borneo Highway.

At most sections, the Federal Route 2105 was built under the JKR R5 road standard, with a speed limit of 90 kilometres per hour (56 mph).

== List of junctions ==
Km	Exit	Junctions	To	Remarks
		Temudok; Temudok Intersection	FT 1 AH150 Pan Borneo Highway West; FT 1 AH150 Jalan Serian-Sri Aman; Simunjan; Serian; Kuching; Temudok Rest and Service Area East; FT 1 AH150 Jalan Sri Aman-Lubuk Antu; Lubuk Antu; Betong; Saratok; Sarikei	3-way intersection
		Kampung Entulang Bungkang		
		Taman Harmoni		
		Kampung Sabu		
		Taman Azba		
		Taman Gamang Heights		
		Kampung STC		
		Taman Sentosa		
		Taman Vistagro		
		Kampung Muhibbah		
		Sri Aman Sports Complex		
		Sri Aman		
		Sri Aman Hospital		
		Sri Aman		
		Sri Aman; Sri Aman Roundabout	North; Jalan Abang Aing; Kampung Hilir; Wisma Persekutuan Sri Aman (Sri Aman Federal Building); Fort Alice; Sri Aman Division Resident's Office; Sri Aman Civic Centre; Sri Aman Mosque; Sri Aman Rest House North; Jalan Paya; Simanggang; Nanga Entulang; Lingga East; Jalan Kelab; Town Centre	4-way roundabout
