= Lupar River =

River in Sarawak, Malaysia

Lupar Sungai Batang Lupar
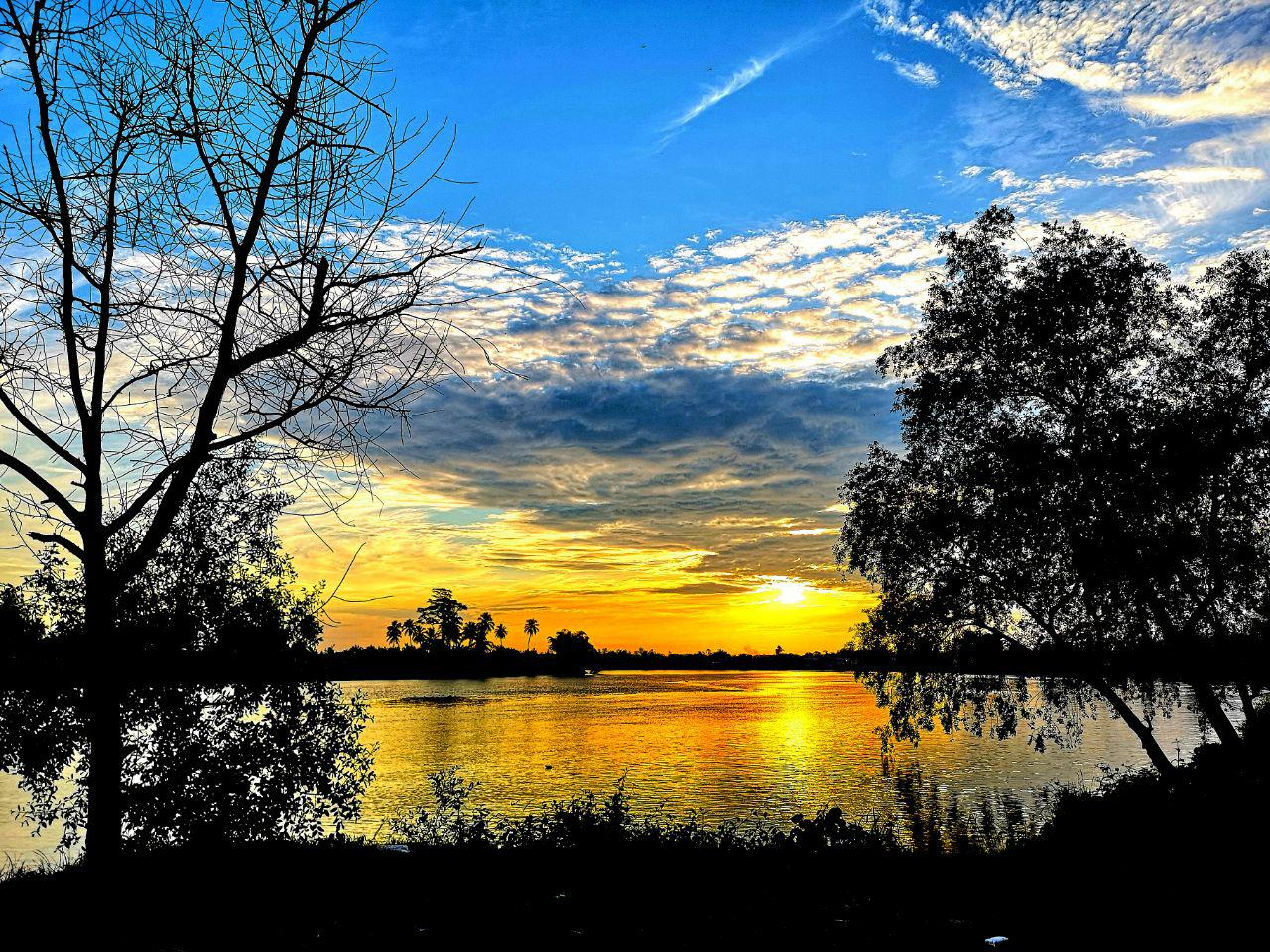
- Sunset at Lupar

- Location in Malaysia. Lupar River (Asia) Lupar River (Earth)
- Native name: Batang Lupar (Malay)

Location
- Country: Malaysia

Physical characteristics
- Source: Klinkang Range
  - location: Malaysia
- Mouth
  - location: South China Sea, Malaysia
  - coordinates: 1°30′51.6″N 110°58′58.7″E
  - elevation: 0 m (0 ft)
- Length: 275 km (171 mi)
- Basin size: 6,558 km^{2} (2,532 mi^{2})
- Discharge
  - location: Sebuyau, Kampung Teriso, South China Sea (near mouth)
  - average: 490 m^{3}/s (17,000 cu ft/s)

The Lupar River (Malay: Sungai Batang Lupar or Batang Lupar) is a river in Sarawak, Malaysia. The river mouth is located between Sebuyau and Kampung Teriso, in Sri Aman Division.

== Overview ==
The Lupar River flows from the Klinkang Range towards the South China Sea. The river flows 275 kilometers and is the third longest river in Sarawak, after the Rajang River and Baram River.

Notable settlements

Notable settlements along the Lupar River, arranged from the mouth to upriver are:

- Sebuyau;
- Kampung Teriso;
- Lingga;
- Simanggang;
- Engkilili.

== Tidal bore ==
The tidal bore, known locally as benak, is a natural phenomenon in which the incoming tide forms waves up to three meters high that travel up the river against the current. The Lupar River is among 56 places in the world where the tidal bore has been observed.

== Wildlife ==
Crocodile attacks

The Lupar River has seen numerous crocodile attacks. Between 1900 and 2017, 22.2% of crocodile attacks in Sarawak were recorded in the Lupar Basin, the highest in the state.

These crocodile attacks became the source of local legend and mythology, named Bujang Senang (happy bachelor) which refers to a 19 ft-crocodile that inhabited the Lupar River. The colloquial name of "bujang" means someone who is a champ, a great person, and it is a sign of respect while “Senang” refers to the Senang River, one of the tributaries of the Lupar River where the first known attack by this crocodile had happened. In popular culture, the name Bujang Senang (the Crocs) was adopted as the nickname of the state’s football team Sarawak FA.
