= Nanga Entulang =

- Location within Borneo
- Coordinates: 1.26667°N 111.4°E
- Country: Malaysia
- State: Sarawak
- Elevation: 6 m (20 ft)

Nanga Entulang is a settlement in the Sri Aman District of Sarawak, Malaysia. It is on the southeast bank of the Batang Lupar river, and includes the eponymous stream Sungai Entulang. The word nanga means "stream mouth".

Neighbouring settlements include:

- Rumah Sandai 1.4 kilometres (0.87 mi) west
- Skra 2.6 kilometres (1.6 mi) northeast
- Setumbin 4 kilometres (2.5 mi) north
- Sungai Gran 4 kilometres (2.5 mi) north
- Temelan 5.5 kilometres (3.4 mi) east
- Bijat 5.6 kilometres (3.5 mi) south
- Kampong Ilir 5.9 kilometres (3.7 mi) east
- Sri Aman 6.3 kilometres (3.9 mi) east
