= Entulang =

Entulang may refer to:

- Entulang, a local or variety name of tree species Durio graveolens
- Entulang junction on Malaysia Federal Route 1 (Sarawak)
- Kampung Entulang Bungkang, a junction on Jalan Sri Aman, Malaysia
- Nanga Entulang, a settlement in the Sri Aman District of Sarawak, Malaysia
- Sekolah Kebangsaan Sungai Entulang, a school in Sarawak, Malaysia
- Sungai Entulang, stream in Sarawak, Malaysia
- Sungai Entulang, different river in Sarawak, Malaysia
