= Bijat =

- Location within Borneo
- Coordinates: 1.31667°N 111.4°E
- Country: Malaysia
- State: Sarawak
- Elevation: 51 m (167 ft)

Bijat is a settlement in Sarawak, Malaysia. It lies approximately 122.3 kilometres (76.0 mi) east-south-east of the state capital Kuching. Neighbouring settlements include:

- Simanggang 2.6 kilometres (1.6 mi) northeast
- Setumbin 2.6 kilometres (1.6 mi) southwest
- Skra 4.1 kilometres (2.5 mi) southeast
- Nanga Entulang 5.6 kilometres (3.5 mi) south
- Temelan 7.9 kilometres (4.9 mi) southeast
- Antek 9.3 kilometres (5.8 mi) west
