= Walter Chambers =

Anglican bishop (1824–1893)

Walter Chambers DD (17 December 1824 – 21 December 1893) was the second Bishop of Labuan and Sarawak from 1868 to 1881.

Chambers was born on 17 December 1824 in Mansfield, Nottinghamshire. He was ordained deacon in 1849 and priest in 1850. Chambers briefly served as curate at Bentley, Derbyshire before embarking on a missionary career in Borneo.

== Ministry in Sarawak ==
Chambers began ministering in place which was called Sakarran. After his evangelisation effort failed there due to conflict with the Dayak people who lived there, he was placed in Lingga. There, he oversaw the growth of Christian community which leads to the construction of the local parish church which is called St. Paul's Church in 1857.

In May 1868, Chambers was appointed archdeacon of Sarawak by Bishop Francis McDougall. After McDougall's retirement in July 1868, he was ordained bishop of Labuan on 29 June 1869 at Westminster Abbey and later installed as bishop of Sarawak on 5 June 1870. He was conferred a D.D. degree upon his elevation to the episcopate.

Chambers served as bishop until August 1878, when ill health forced him to return to England for treatment. Unable to recover sufficiently to travel back to Southeast Asia and resume his responsibilities, he informed Archbishop of Canterbury Archibald Campbell Tait in November 1879 of his intention to retire but retained his title until early 1881 when George Hose was selected to succeed him.

== Personal life ==
He had arrived in Sarawak in 1851, married Lizzie Wooley, another missionary and cousin of the bishop's wife, Harriette McDougall, in 1857, and resigned in 1879.

== Death ==
He died on 21 December 1893, aged 69, at his home in Kensington, London and he was buried in Aberystwyth.

Church of England titles
Preceded by Francis Thomas McDougall	Bishop of Labuan and Sarawak; 1868 – 1881	Succeeded by George Frederick Hose
