= Kampung Sungai Meranti =

- Location within Borneo
- Coordinates: 1.58333°N 111°E
- Country: Malaysia
- State: Sarawak
- Elevation: 1 m (3.3 ft)

Kampung Sungai Meranti is a coastal settlement in Sarawak, Malaysia. It lies approximately 74.2 kilometres (46 mi) east of the state capital Kuching.

Neighbouring settlements include:

- Kampung Teriso 5.6 kilometres (3.5 mi) south
- Maludam 8.3 kilometres (5.2 mi) northeast
- Sebuyau 10.5 kilometres (6.5 mi) southwest
- Kampung Raba 12.4 kilometres (7.7 mi) southwest
- Kampung Lintang 13.4 kilometres (8.3 mi) southwest
- Melebu 15 kilometres (9.3 mi) northeast
- Samarang 15.7 kilometres (9.8 mi) northeast
