= Mintu =

- Location within Borneo
- Coordinates: 1.26667°N 111.03333°E
- Country: Malaysia
- State: Sarawak
- Elevation: 88 m (289 ft)

Mintu (also known as Rumah Bol or Rumah Bel) is a settlement in Sarawak, Malaysia. It lies approximately 85.5 kilometres (53 mi) east-south-east of the state capital Kuching.

Neighbouring settlements include:

- Rumah Abat 8.3 kilometres (5.2 mi) southeast
- Kampung Kepayang 11.3 kilometres (7.0 mi) west
- Kampung Gayau 13.5 kilometres (8.4 mi) west
- Kampung Munggu Ayer 15 kilometres (9.3 mi) west
- Kampung Isu 15 kilometres (9.3 mi) southwest
- Lingga 15 kilometres (9.3 mi) east
- Isu 15 kilometres (9.3 mi) south
