= Santubong =

Santubong may refer to:

- Mount Santubong, Sarawak
- Santubong (federal constituency), represented in the Dewan Rakyat
