= Sebeliau =

- Location within Borneo
- Coordinates: 1.21667°N 111.73333°E
- Country: Malaysia
- State: Sarawak
- Administrative Division: Lubok Antu
- Elevation: 83 m (272 ft)

Sebeliau is a riverside village in the Lubok Antu division of Sarawak, Malaysia. It lies approximately 161 kilometres (100 mi) east-southeast of the state capital Kuching.

Sebeliau jetty is the embarkation point for tourists travelling up the Lemanak River to visit an Iban longhouse.

Neighbouring settlements include:

- Serubah 2.6 kilometres (1.6 mi) northeast
- Sureh 2.6 kilometres (1.6 mi) northeast
- Sepelu 3.7 kilometres (2.3 mi) west
- Subong 3.7 kilometres (2.3 mi) east
- Nanga San Semanju 4.1 kilometres (2.5 mi) northwest
- Nanga Semueh 5.6 kilometres (3.5 mi) west
- Sungai Nibong 5.6 kilometres (3.5 mi) north
- Luboh Subong 5.9 kilometres (3.7 mi) east
- Subong 5.9 kilometres (3.7 mi) east
- Nyako 5.9 kilometres (3.7 mi) east
