= Setumbin =

- Location within Borneo
- Coordinates: 1.3°N 111.38333°E
- Country: Malaysia
- State: Sarawak
- Elevation: 31 m (102 ft)

Setumbin is a settlement in Sarawak, Malaysia. It lies approximately 121 kilometres (75.2 mi) east-south-east of the state capital Kuching. Neighbouring settlements include:

- Bijat 2.6 kilometres (1.6 mi) northeast
- Skra 4.1 kilometres (2.5 mi) southeast
- Simanggang 5.2 kilometres (3.2 mi) northeast
- Taba 7.4 kilometres (4.6 mi) west
- Antek 7.6 kilometres (4.7 mi) west
