= Sadong Jaya =

State constituency in Sarawak, Malaysia

Sadong Jaya (N24)
Sarawak constituency

State constituency
- Legislature: Sarawak State Legislative Assembly
MLA
Vacant
- Constituency created: 1996
- First contested: 1996
- Last contested: 2026

Sadong Jaya is a state constituency in Sarawak, Malaysia, that has been represented in the Sarawak State Legislative Assembly since 1996.

The state constituency was created in the 1996 redistribution and is mandated to return a single member to the Sarawak State Legislative Assembly under the first past the post voting system.

== Demographics ==
Ethnic breakdown of Sadong Jaya's electorate as of 2022
1. Malay-Muslim bumiputera (90.2%)
2. Chinese (7.60%)
3. Sarawak bumiputera (1.90%)
4. Other ethnicities (0.30%)

== History ==
As of 2020, Sadong Jaya has a population of 10,954 people.

=== Polling districts ===
According to the gazette issued on 31 October 2022, the Sadong Jaya constituency has a total of 9 polling districts.

State constituency	Polling Districts	Code	Location
Sadong Jaya（N24）	Sepayor	200/24/01	SJK (C) Chung Hua Semera
Sadong Jaya（N24）	Semera	200/24/02	SK Haji Kelali Semera
Sadong Jaya（N24）	Jemukan	200/24/03	SK Jemukan
Sadong Jaya（N24）	Jemukan Ulu	200/24/04	SJK (C) Chung Hua Jemukan
Sadong Jaya（N24）	Sadong Jaya	200/24/05	SK Pendam
Sadong Jaya（N24）	Sadong Jaya Ulu	200/24/06	Dewan Masyarakat Kpg Sadong Jaya Ulu
Sadong Jaya（N24）	Jaie	200/24/07	SK Jaie
Sadong Jaya（N24）	Iboi	200/24/08	SK Iboi / Pelandok
Sadong Jaya（N24）	Pelandok	200/24/09	Dewan Masyarakat Kpg. Pelandok

=== Representation history ===
Members of the Legislative Assembly for Sadong Jaya
Assembly	No	Years	Member	Party
Constituency created, created from Semera and Sebuyau
14th	N18	1996–2001	Wan Abdul Wahab Wan Sanusi	BN (PBB)
15th	N18	2001–2006	Wan Abdul Wahab Wan Sanusi	BN (PBB)
16th	N20	2006–2011	Wan Abdul Wahab Wan Sanusi	BN (PBB)
17th	N20	2011–2016	Aidel Lariwoo	BN (PBB)
18th	N24	2016–2018	Aidel Lariwoo	BN (PBB)
18th	N24	2018–2021	Aidel Lariwoo	GPS (PBB)
19th	N24	2021–2026	Aidel Lariwoo	GPS (PBB)

== Election results ==
Sarawak state election, 2026: Sadong Jaya
Party	Candidate	Votes	%	∆%
GPS				▲
PH				▲
Total valid votes				
Total rejected ballots				
Unreturned ballots				
Turnout				
Registered electors				
Majority				

Sarawak state election, 2021: Sadong Jaya
Party	Candidate	Votes	%	∆%
GPS	Aidel Lariwoo	4,333	82.96	▲82.96
PSB	Nur Khairunisa Abdullah	456	8.73	▲8.73
PKR	Piee Ling	319	6.11	▲6.11
PBK	Jolhi Bee	115	2.20	▲2.20
Total valid votes		5,223	100.00	
Total rejected ballots		64		
Unreturned ballots		14		
Turnout		5,301	69.27	▼2.95
Registered electors		7,653		
Majority		3,877	74.23	▲1.61
GPS gain from BN		Swing		?
Source(s) https://lom.agc.gov.my/ilims/upload/portal/akta/outputp/1718688/PUB687.pdf

Sarawak state election, 2016: Sadong Jaya
Party	Candidate	Votes	%	∆%
BN	Aidel Lariwoo	3,925	82.22	▲9.13
PAS	Asan Singkro	458	9.59	▼9.99
Independent	Awang Rabiee Awang Hosen	234	4.90	▲4.90
Amanah	Othman Mustapha	157	3.29	▲3.29
Total valid votes		4,774	100.00	
Total rejected ballots		80		
Unreturned ballots		20		
Turnout		4,874	72.22	▼0.78
Registered electors		6,749		
Majority		3,467	72.62	▲19.10
BN hold		Swing		
Source(s) "Federal Government Gazette - Notice of Contested Election, State Legislative Assembly of the State of Sarawak [P.U. (B) 190/2016]" (PDF). Attorney General's Chambers of Malaysia. 25 April 2016. Archived from the original (PDF) on 2017-06-12. "Senarai Calon yang Disahkan Layak Bertanding Pilihan Raya Dewan Undangan Negeri ke-11". Election Commission of Malaysia. 25 April 2016. Archived from the original on 25 April 2016.

Sarawak state election, 2011: Sadong Jaya
Party	Candidate	Votes	%	∆%
BN	Aidel Lariwoo	4,008	73.09	▲13.71
PAS	Abang Eddy Allyanni Abang Fauzi	1,074	19.58	▲19.58
Independent	Mahayuddin Wahab	402	7.33	▲7.33
Total valid votes		5,484	100.00	
Total rejected ballots		89		
Unreturned ballots		16		
Turnout		5,589	73.00	▲5.89
Registered electors		7,656		
Majority		2,934	53.52	▲34.75
BN hold		Swing		
Source(s) "Federal Government Gazette - Results of Contested Election and Statements of the Poll after the Official Addition of Votes Sarawak [P.U. (B) 245/2011]" (PDF). Attorney General's Chambers of Malaysia. 29 April 2011.

Sarawak state election, 2006: Sadong Jaya
Party	Candidate	Votes	%	∆%
BN	Wan Wahap @ Wan Abdul Wahab Wan Sanusi	2,715	59.38	▼14.49
PKR	Piee Ling	1,857	40.62	▲40.62
Total valid votes		4,572	100.00	
Total rejected ballots		67		
Unreturned ballots		3		
Turnout		4,642	67.11	▼4.23
Registered electors		6,917		
Majority		858	18.77	▼36.35
BN hold		Swing		

Sarawak state election, 2001: Sadong Jaya
Party	Candidate	Votes	%	∆%
BN	Wan Wahap @ Wan Abdul Wahab Wan Sanusi	3,888	73.87	▲5.96
PAS	Adam Ahid	987	18.75	▲18.75
Independent	Shapee Lahat	388	7.37	▲7.37
Total valid votes		5,263	100.00	
Total rejected ballots		91		
Unreturned ballots		1		
Turnout		5,355	71.34	▲2.72
Registered electors		7,506		
Majority		2,901	55.12	▲19.30
BN hold		Swing		

Sarawak state election, 1996: Sadong Jaya
Party	Candidate	Votes	%
BN	Wan Wahap @ Wan Abdul Wahab Wan Sanusi	3,429	67.91
Independent	Wan Zainal Abidin Wan Sanusi	1,620	32.09
Total valid votes		5,049	100.00
Total rejected ballots		79	
Unreturned ballots		0	
Turnout		5,128	68.62
Registered electors		7,473	
Majority		1,809	35.83
This was a new constituency created.
