= Sri Aman (federal constituency) =

Federal constituency of Sarawak, Malaysia

Sri Aman (P202)
Sarawak constituency

Federal constituency
- Legislature: Dewan Rakyat
- MP: Doris Sophia Brodi; GPS
- Constituency created: 1987
- First contested: 1990
- Last contested: 2022

Demographics
- Population (2020): 62,863
- Electors (2022): 50,164
- Area (km²): 2,678
- Pop. density (per km²): 23.5

Sri Aman is a federal constituency in Serian Division (Serian District), Samarahan Division (Sebuyau District) and Sri Aman Division (Sri Aman District, Lingga District and Pantu District), Sarawak, Malaysia, that has been represented in the Dewan Rakyat since 1990.

The federal constituency was created in the 1987 redistribution and is mandated to return a single member to the Dewan Rakyat under the first past the post voting system.

== Demographics ==
https://ge15.orientaldaily.com.my/seats/sarawak/p

Ethnic breakdown of Sri Aman's electorate as of 2022
1. Sarawak bumiputera (69.9%)
2. Chinese (16.9%)
3. Malay-Muslim bumiputera (12.4%)
4. Other ethnicities (0.80%)

As of 2020, Sri Aman has a population of 62,863 people.

Age breakdown of Sri Aman's electorate as of 2022
1. 18-20 (6.29%)
2. 21-29 (20.5%)
3. 30-39 (19.1%)
4. 40-49 (16.3%)
5. 50-59 (16.1%)
6. 60-69 (12.5%)
7. 70-79 (6.78%)
8. 80-89 (2.03%)
9. above 90 (0.50%)
Gender breakdown of Sri Aman's electorate as of 2022
1. Male (50.3%)
2. Female (49.7%)

== History ==
=== Polling districts ===
According to the gazette issued on 31 October 2022, the Sri Aman constituency has a total of 19 polling districts.

State constituency	Polling Districts	Code	Location
Balai Ringin（N30）	Isu	202/30/01	Balai Raya Kpg. Kesindu Simunjan; RH Suntat Galung Kpg. Sebangkoi Jaya Simunjan; RH Ganti Anak Jentai, Sabal Kruin; SK Sg. Pinang; SK Gawang Empili; SK Nyelitak; SK Telagus / Jerok; Sabal Nursery Centre
Balai Ringin（N30）	Balai Ringin	202/30/02	SK Semada; Balai Raya Kpg. Ensebang Kuari; SK Balai Ringin; RH Rentap Ak Gasan Melikin Sg. Panggil; RH Aning Anak Melintang Ensebang Pelai; Balai Raya Tanah Mawang
Balai Ringin（N30）	Ruan	202/30/03	Dewan Serbaguna Kpg. Kepit Bukit Punda Simunjan; RH Jepit Kpg. Spaoh Raba; Dewan Sri Kumang SK Padang Pedalai
Balai Ringin（N30）	Kedumpai	202/30/04	RH Enterus Kpg. Sega; SK Kedumpai; RH Umpang Anak Kiot. Kampung Pendawan, Simunjan; SK Tuba; SK Mentu Ulu Sebuyau; RH Menari Ipoh; RH Merajan Semawa; SK Muding
Balai Ringin（N30）	Ubah	202/30/05	RH Ngulu Empaling A; RH Jawan Tekuyong B; SK Jaong; SK Abok; SK Aping; RH Langie Anak Tawie Sebemban; SK St. Leo Gayau
Balai Ringin（N30）	Pantu	202/30/06	Tadika Kemas Rapak; RH Hearold Selantel III Pantu; SJK (C) Chung Hua Pantu; SK Pantu
Balai Ringin（N30）	Keranggas	202/30/07	SK Keranggas Pantu; Tadika Kemas Sapak
Bukit Begungan (N31)	Banting	202/31/01	Balai Raya Banting; SK Engkeranji Lingga; RH Edward Mamut Langgir Lingga; RH Jack Engkerepok Lingga
Bukit Begungan (N31)	Kara	202/31/02	RH Guang, Kara Pantu; RH Rekie Anak Sumpit, Kpg Punggu Tengah; RH Francis Doblin Anak Betol Selanjan Angkong; SK Selanjan Enchiap; RH Johnny Anak Gura Selanjan Enchiap; SK St Martin Lachau; RH Tanggu Kubau Ili; SJK (C) Chung Hua Bangkong
Bukit Begungan (N31)	Melugu	202/31/03	Dewan Masyarakat Gua; RH Jawan Panggil; Balai Raya RH Anyai Entulang; Kelas 2, SK Temudok Kem
Bukit Begungan (N31)	Klauh	202/31/04	RH Kedeni, Batu Besai; Balai Raya RH Beriku Pakit; SK Selepong; SMK Melugu; RH Wilson Bana, Po Ai Dau
Bukit Begungan (N31)	Bukit Balau	202/31/05	SK Bakong; RH Langau Anak Selumbang Jongkong Panjai; RH Resa Ak Gayau Empelanjau Asal Bakong; SK Tanjong Bijat
Simanggang (N32)	Sabu	202/32/01	SK St. Lawrance
Simanggang (N32)	Simanggang	202/32/02	SK Abang Aing Sri Aman; SK Sri Aman; Dewan SMK Sri Aman
Simanggang (N32)	Lumanak Seberang	202/32/03	RH Thomas Lepong Empeliau; SJK (C) Chung Hua Simanggang
Simanggang (N32)	Munggu Sabun	202/32/04	Bangunan Perkumpulan Wanita
Simanggang (N32)	Sengat	202/32/05	RH Rengkang Lepong Empeliau; RH Lutang; SK Nangga Klassim Undop
Simanggang (N32)	Undup	202/32/06	RH Thomas Laman Sengkuang; RH Bandi Sebangkoi Undop; SK Batu Lintang Undop; SK Paku Undop; RH Pilit Kaong
Simanggang (N32)	Bayai	202/32/07	RH Empol Sg. Tenggak; Balai Raya RH Lichang, Kpg. Entawa, Undop; Bangunan Tabika KEMAS Kpg. Siga Jalan Paip, Undop

=== Representation history ===
Members of Parliament for Sri Aman
Parliament	No	Years	Member	Party	Vote Share
Constituency created from Batang Lupar
8th	P163	1990-1995	Daniel Tajem Miri	BN (PBDS)	9,740; 66.08%
9th	P175	1995-1999	Jimmy Lim @ Jimmy Donald	BN (PBDS)	11,017; 67.89%
10th	P176	1999-2004	Jimmy Lim @ Jimmy Donald	BN (PRS)	11,439; 74.84%
11th	P202	2004-2008	Jimmy Lim @ Jimmy Donald	BN (PRS)	9,679; 64.57%
12th	P202	2008-2013	Masir Kujat	BN (PRS)	9,700; 64.03%
13th	P202	2013-2018	Masir Kujat	BN (PRS)	12,168; 54.99%
14th	P202	2018	Masir Kujat	BN (PRS)	14,141; 61.48%
14th	P202	2018-2019	Masir Kujat	GPS (PRS)	14,141; 61.48%
14th	P202	2019-2022	Masir Kujat	PSB	14,141; 61.48%
14th	P202	2022	Masir Kujat	Independent	14,141; 61.48%
15th	P202	2022–present	Doris Sophia Brodi	GPS (PRS)	14,131; 44.27%

=== State constituency ===
Parliamentary constituency	State constituency					
Parliamentary constituency	1969–1978	1978–1990	1990–1999	1999–2008	2008–2016	2016−present
Sri Aman					Balai Ringin	
Sri Aman			Bukit Begunan			
Sri Aman			Simanggang			

=== Historical boundaries ===
State Constituency	Area			
State Constituency	1987	1996	2005	2015
Balai Ringin			Balai Ringin; Kedumpai; Pantu; Sebangkoi Jaya; Sungai Tenggang	
Bukit Begunan	Bangkong; Bukit Begunan; Sungai Tenggang; Pantu; Temudok		Bangkong; Bukit Balau; Bukit Begunan; Melugu; Temudok	
Simanggang	Batu Lintang; Gran; Pruan; Sri Aman; Sungai Tenggak		Batu Lintang; Simanggang; Sri Aman; Sri Jaya; Ungkup	

=== Current state assembly members ===
No.	State Constituency	Member	Coalition (Party)
N30	Balai Ringin	Snowdan Lawan	GPS (PRS)
N31	Bukit Begunan	Mong Dagang	GPS (PRS)
N32	Simanggang	Francis Harden Hollis	GPS (SUPP)

=== Local governments & postcodes ===
No.	State Constituency	Local Government	Postcode
N30	Balai Ringin	Serian District Council (Balai Ringin area); Simunjan District Council; Sri Aman District Council (Pantu area)	94800 Simunjan; 94900 Lingga; 95000 Sri Aman
N31	Bukit Begunan	Sri Aman District Council	94800 Simunjan; 94900 Lingga; 95000 Sri Aman
N32	Simanggang	Sri Aman District Council	94800 Simunjan; 94900 Lingga; 95000 Sri Aman

== Election results ==
Malaysian general election, 2022
Party	Candidate	Votes	%	∆%
GPS	Doris Sophia Brodi	14,131	44.27	▲44.27
PSB	Wilson Entabang	10,092	31.62	▲31.62
Independent	Masir Kujat	5,673	17.77	▲17.77
PH	Tay Wei Wei	2,021	6.33	▲6.33
Total valid votes		31,917	100.00	
Total rejected ballots		435		
Unreturned ballots		97		
Turnout		32,449	63.63	▼7.18
Registered electors		50,164		
Majority		4,039	12.65	▼12.65
GPS gain from BN		Swing		?
Source(s) https://lom.agc.gov.my/ilims/upload/portal/akta/outputp/1753265/PARLIMEN%20SARAWAK%20(PUB%20620).pdf

Malaysian general election, 2018
Party	Candidate	Votes	%	∆%
BN	Masir Kujat	14,141	61.48	▲6.49
PKR	Norina Umoi Utot	8,321	36.18	▲10.79
PBDS Baru	Cobbold Lusoi	538	2.34	▲2.34
Total valid votes		23,000	100.00	
Total rejected ballots		295		
Unreturned ballots		84		
Turnout		23,379	70.81	▼4.42
Registered electors		33,016		
Majority		5,820	25.30	▼4.30
BN hold		Swing		
Source(s) "His Majesty's Government Gazette - Notice of Contested Election, Parliament for the State of Sarawak [P.U. (B) 247/2018]" (PDF). Attorney General's Chambers of Malaysia. 3 May 2018. "Federal Government Gazette - Results of Contested Election and Statements of the Poll after the Official Addition of Votes, Parliamentary Constituencies for the State of Sarawak [P.U. (B) 321/2018]" (PDF). Attorney General's Chambers of Malaysia. 28 May 2018.

Malaysian general election, 2013
Party	Candidate	Votes	%	∆%
BN	Masir Kujat	12,168	54.99	▼9.04
PKR	Nicholas Mujah Ason	5,618	25.39	▲25.39
Independent	Donald Lawan	3,867	17.47	▲17.47
Sarawak Workers Party	Wilfred Landong	476	2.15	▲2.15
Total valid votes		22,129	100.00	
Total rejected ballots		224		
Unreturned ballots		56		
Turnout		22,409	75.23	▲14.92
Registered electors		29,789		
Majority		6,550	29.60	▲1.54
BN hold		Swing		
Source(s) "Federal Government Gazette - Notice of Contested Election, Parliament for the State of Sarawak [P.U. (B) 184/2013]" (PDF). Attorney General's Chambers of Malaysia. 26 April 2013. "Federal Government Gazette - Results of Contested Election and Statements of the Poll after the Official Addition of Votes, Parliamentary Constituencies for the State of Sarawak [P.U. (B) 225/2013]" (PDF). Attorney General's Chambers of Malaysia. 22 May 2013.

Malaysian general election, 2008
Party	Candidate	Votes	%	∆%
BN	Masir Kujat	9,700	64.03	▼0.54
Independent	Cobbold Lusoi	5,448	35.97	▲0.54
Total valid votes		15,148	100.00	
Total rejected ballots		211		
Unreturned ballots		154		
Turnout		15,513	60.31	▲4.98
Registered electors		25,724		
Majority		4,252	28.06	▼1.08
BN hold		Swing		

Malaysian general election, 2004
Party	Candidate	Votes	%	∆%
BN	Jimmy Lim @ Jimmy Donald	9,679	64.57	▼9.97
Independent	Cobbold Lusoi	5,311	35.43	▲35.43
Total valid votes		14,990	100.00	
Total rejected ballots		316		
Unreturned ballots		194		
Turnout		15,500	55.33	▼4.12
Registered electors		28,013		
Majority		4,368	29.14	▼20.54
BN hold		Swing		

Malaysian general election, 1999
Party	Candidate	Votes	%	∆%
BN	Jimmy Lim @ Jimmy Donald	11,439	74.84	▲6.95
PKR	Wel @ Maxwell Rojis	3,845	25.16	▲25.16
Total valid votes		15,284	100.00	
Total rejected ballots		411		
Unreturned ballots		1,125		
Turnout		16,820	59.45	▼4.73
Registered electors		28,292		
Majority		7,594	49.68	▲13.90
BN hold		Swing		

Malaysian general election, 1995
Party	Candidate	Votes	%	∆%
BN	Jimmy Lim @ Jimmy Donald	11,017	67.89	▲1.81
Independent	Jacob Emang @ Imang	5,211	32.11	▲18.81
Total valid votes		16,228	100.00	
Total rejected ballots		481		
Unreturned ballots		950		
Turnout		17,659	64.18	▲1.18
Registered electors		27,514		
Majority		5,806	35.78	▼9.68
BN hold		Swing		

Malaysian general election, 1990
Party	Candidate	Votes	%
BN	Daniel Tajem Miri	9,740	66.08
Independent	Barat Utek	3,039	20.62
Independent	Jacob Imang	1,960	13.30
Total valid votes		14,739	100.00
Total rejected ballots		260	
Unreturned ballots			
Turnout		14,999	63.00
Registered electors		23,807	
Majority		6,701	45.46
This was a new constituency created.
