= Skra =

- Location within Borneo
- Coordinates: 1.28333°N 111.41667°E
- Country: Malaysia
- State: Sarawak
- Elevation: 46 m (151 ft)

Skra is a settlement in Sarawak, Malaysia. It lies approximately 125.1 kilometres (77.7 mi) east-south-east of the state capital Kuching. Neighbouring settlements include:

- Setumbin 4.1 kilometres (2.5 mi) northwest
- Bijat 4.1 kilometres (2.5 mi) northwest
- Simanggang 5.6 kilometres (3.5 mi) north
