= Santubong National Park =

National park in Sarawak, Malaysia

- IUCN category II (national park)
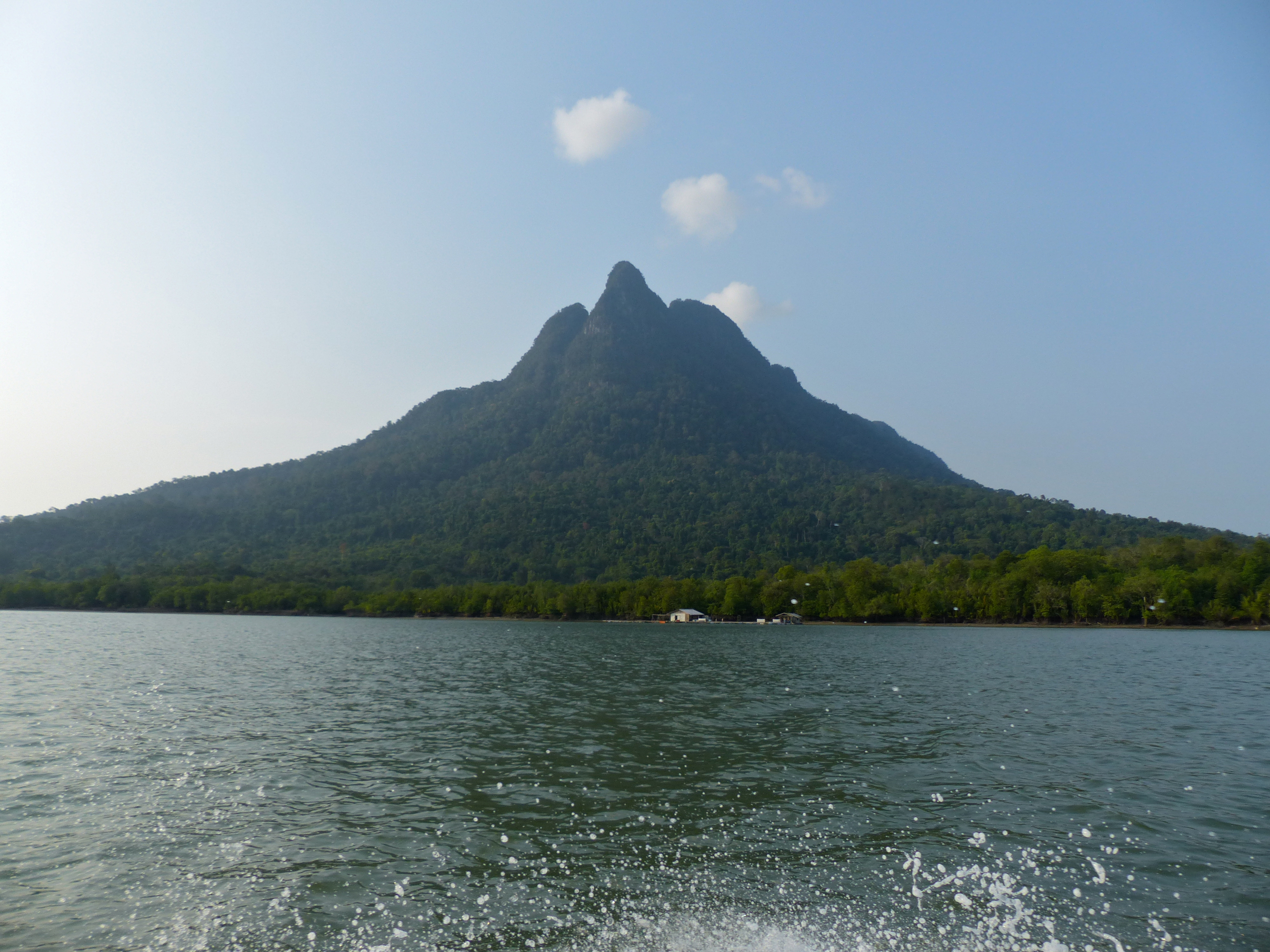
- Mount Santubong viewed from a distance

- Location within Borneo
- Location: Sarawak, Malaysia
- Nearest city: Kuching
- Coordinates: 1°45′46″N 110°19′20″E
- Area: 14.1 km^{2} (5.4 sq mi)
- Established: 2007
- Governing body: Sarawak Forestry Corporation

Santubong National Park (Malay: Taman Negara Santubong) is located on the Santubong Peninsula, approximately 35 kilometres (22 mi) north of Kuching. Dominated by the steep, rainforest-covered slopes of Mount Santubong, which rises to 810 metres (2,660 ft), the park forms an important catchment area that supports a variety of wildlife. The mountain's prominent peak is a notable feature of the landscape and is often visible from Kuching. The area also includes local fishing villages and cultural sites.

== Geography ==
Gunung Santubong National Park is located on the Santubong Peninsula and covers an area of 14.1 square kilometres (5.4 sq mi). The park is dominated by mixed dipterocarp forest, with smaller patches of kerangas (heath forest) and beach forest. Its most prominent feature is the 810-metre-high peak of Gunung Santubong. The park is partially bordered by privately owned forest and lies within a region known for its scenic coastal and mountainous landscapes. The surrounding area includes Malay fishing villages such as Kampung Santubong, Kampung Buntal, and Kampung Pasir Pandak, as well as the Sarawak Cultural Village, several beach resorts, and recreational facilities.

== History ==
Since Alfred Russel Wallace's November 1854 – January 1856 voyage to Sarawak in the middle of the 19th century, scientists have been interested in the biodiversity of the Santubong region. Wallace carried out a great deal of biological sampling while he was there, especially in the slopes of Mount Santubong and in the Sarawak River valley. His research in the area helped advance scientific understanding of the coastal ecosystems of Sarawak.

Mount Santubong was officially gazetted as a national park in 2007. Since then, it has become a key destination for nature tourism, attracting both local and international visitors.

== Flora and fauna ==
The rhinoceros hornbill, once widely distributed across southern Thailand, Peninsular Malaysia, and the islands of Sumatra, Java, and Borneo, is now believed to be extinct in Singapore. It has been recorded in various habitats, including tall secondary forests, mixed dipterocarp forests, and swamp forests. In Santubong National Park, past surveys have noted its presence, although detailed information on its current distribution within the park remains limited. Despite its status as a threatened species and being recognised as Sarawak's state bird, little is known about its population ecology or movement patterns in the region.
