= Mount Santubong =

Mountain in Malaysia

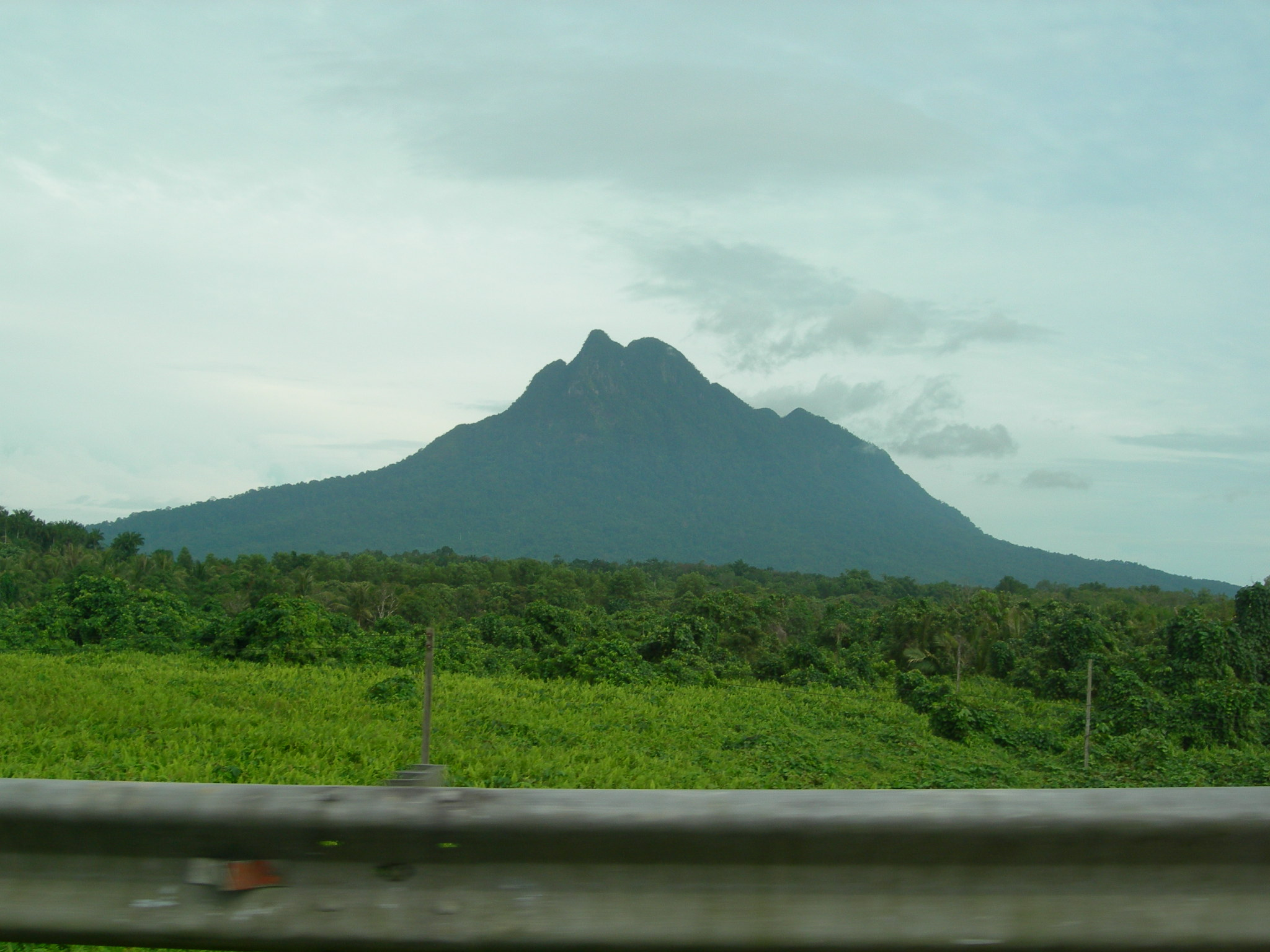
- Mt. Santubong from Santubong Bridge

Highest point
- Elevation: 810.2 m (2,658 ft)
- Prominence: 810 m (2,660 ft)
- Coordinates: 01°44′N 110°20′E

Geography
- Location within Malaysia
- Location: Kuching District, Kuching Division, Sarawak, Malaysia

Geology
- Mountain type: Inselberg

Climbing
- First ascent: Unknown
- Easiest route: Hike

Mount Santubong (Malay: Gunung Santubong) is a mountain in the Malaysian state of Sarawak and highest point of the city of Kuching. It is located on the Damai Peninsular, about 30 km north of the city center.

== Etymology ==
The word "Santubong" was known to Iban and Malay people in Sarawak for "coffin". For Chinese people, the word means "the mountain visible a long way off"(山都望), in which it was claimed that there was a mountain of the same name in China. Some attributed the naming to Hakka Chinese's "San Chu Bong" meaning "wild boar king (山猪王)". The first Chinese who lived there claimed to have seen a huge wild boar as big as a human. In Sarawak Gazette issues published on 30 September 1953 and 30 November 1953, readers I. A. N. Urquhart and C.N. Chong both agreed that "Santubong" was the original Iban word and the Malays did not use the word "Santubong". However, in the Sarawak Gazette issue published on 27 January 1954, P. Aichner stated that the association of Santubong with "coffin" would deter people from going to the place. Therefore, it is more plausible that the word "Santubong" comes from the derivation of the Chinese words.

Between 1974–1975, Haji Madzhi Johari composed and sang the song Puteri Santubong. The song became popular after former Information Minister, the late Tan Sri Mohamed Rahmat proposed that folk songs from all the states be compiled and broadcast almost every day through Radio Televisyen Malaysia radio and television channels. This song narrates the legend of the Malay people, which states that two beautiful daughters of God, named Princess Santubong (Puteri Santubong) and Princess Sejenjang (Puteri Sejenjang) came down from heaven to guard their respective mountains here in Sarawak, namely Mount Santubong and Mount Sejenjang. The job of Princess Santubong was to weave clothes for the whole day, while Princess Sejenjang was to pound rice for the entire day. Each of them praised their own beauty every day and claimed to be the most beautiful woman in the world. They started to quarrel, and Princess Sejenjang hit the cheek of Princess Santubong using a rice pestle, thus causing the Mount Santubong to be broken on one side. Meanwhile, Princess Santubong retaliated by striking and penetrating the head of Princess Sejenjang with batang belidah (a bamboo stick used to weave clothes). Thus, Mount Sejenjang was broken into many surrounding small islands near Mount Santubong, including the Kera island. By 1995, Mount Serapi is included into the legend which the two princesses were fighting over the handsome Prince Serapi and the heavenly king decided to curse each of them into a mountain.

In 2025, a local beer-producing company named "Zebrew" withdrew the "Santubong" brand of beer from the market after the protest from the Santubong member of parliament, Nancy Shukri, and her Malay muslim constituents.

== Ascent ==
Mount Santubong lies within the Santubong National Park. Entry to the park is now via the temporary Sarawak Forestry Corporation park headquarter entrance. The issue of custodian of park entry has now been put to rest by the relevant authorities

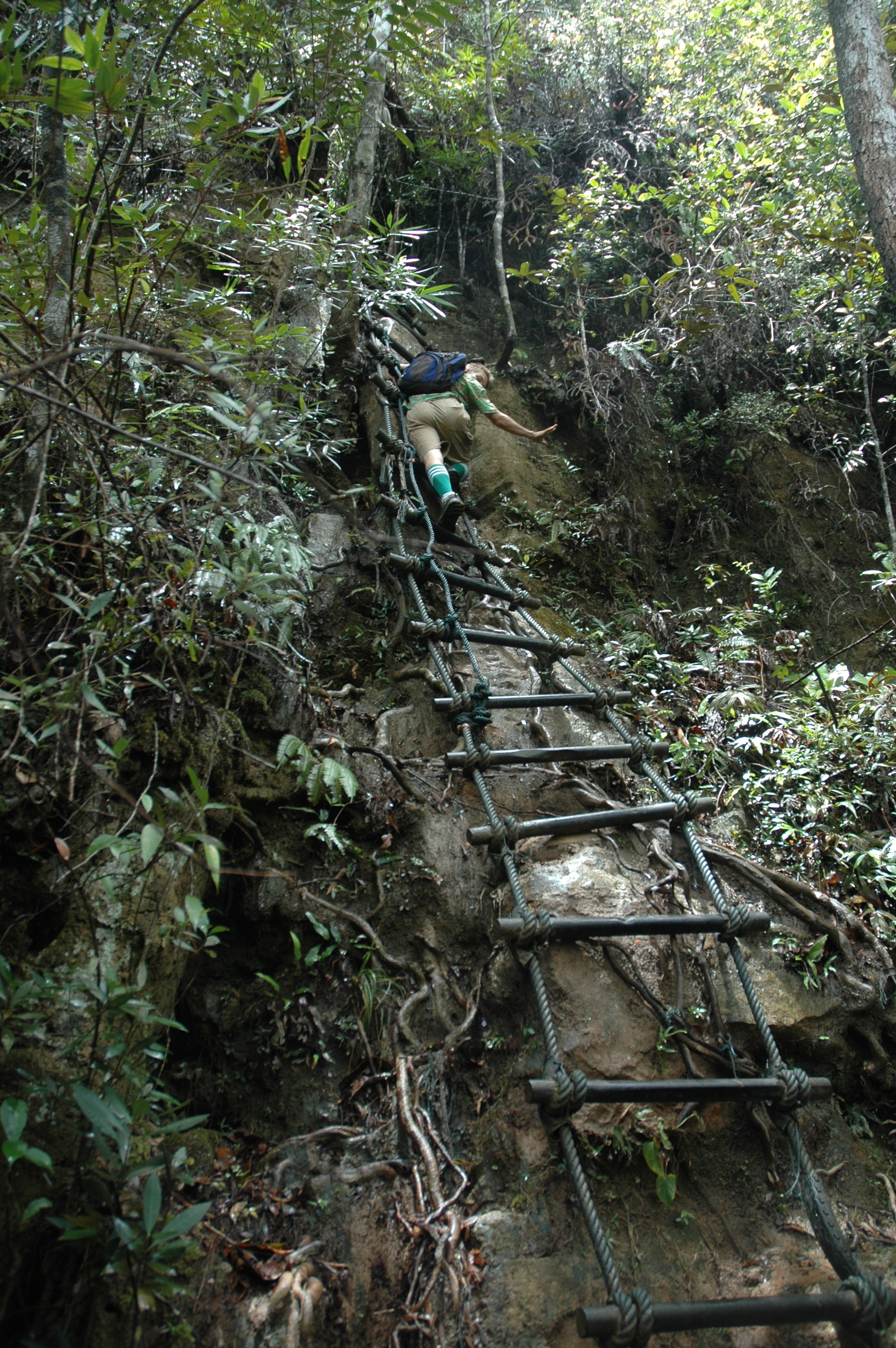
Part of the arduous ascent

== History ==
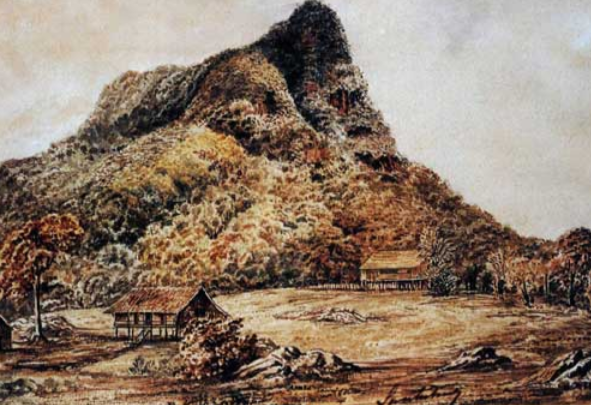
Mount Santubong in the 1850s by Harriette McDougall

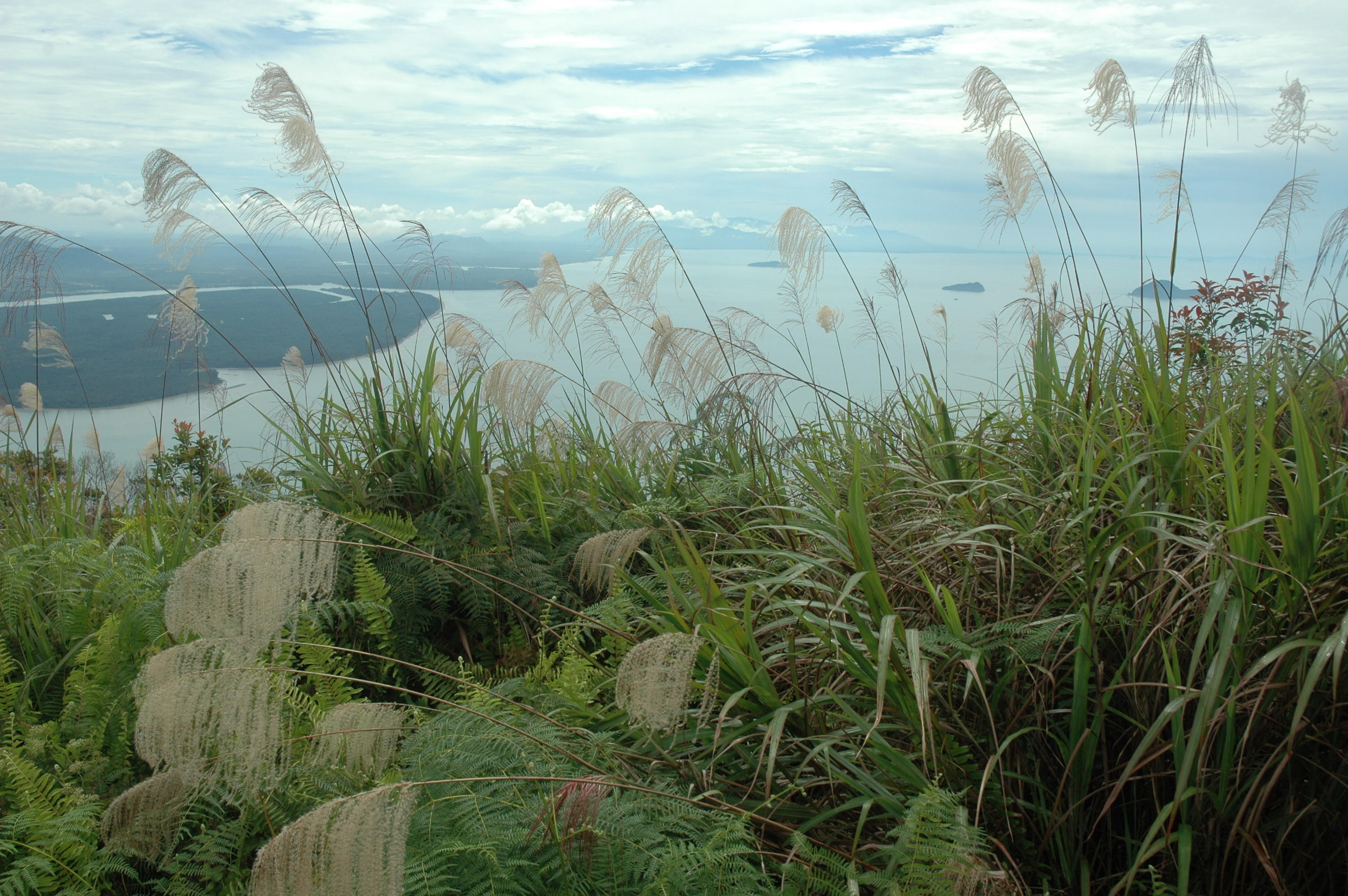
View from the mountain top

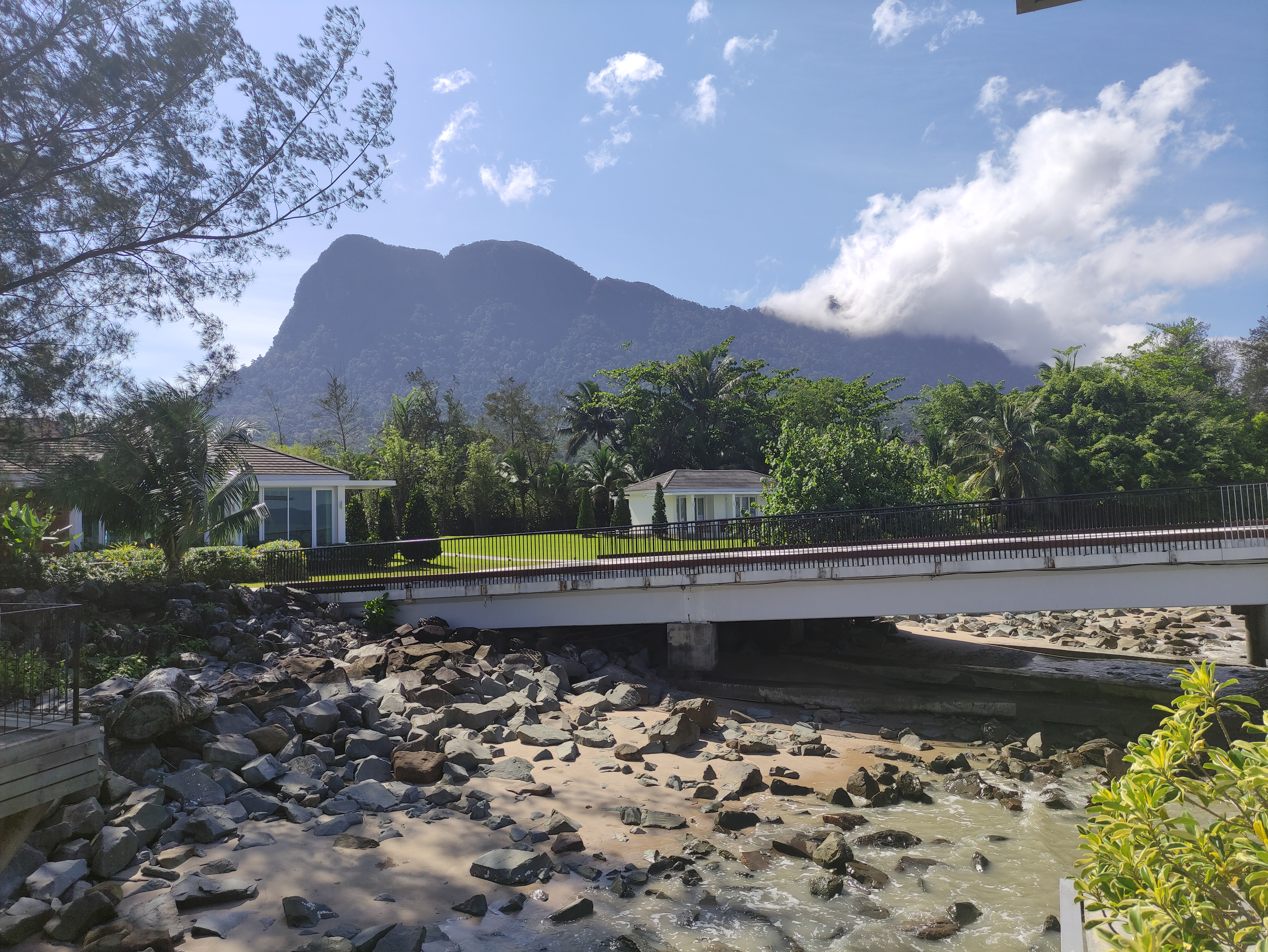
Mount Santubong, viewed from Cove 55 resort

Investigators have made ascents of the steep mountain to find places of archaeological interest. Around its foot are signs of Hindu occupation, which are hundreds of years old and have been investigated by the Sarawak Museum.

There are many versions of the Datu Merapati stories, who is believed to be the ancestor of all the Malays in Sarawak. One of the earliest version was recorded by Harold H. Everett and John Hewitt in 1909. In this story, there was a heavenly person, namely Rajah Paribata Sri, who had three sons, namely Radin Depati, Radin Urei Sri and Radin Gosti. Radin Depati was married to Dayang Suri, a daughter of the Johor Sultanate. He went to Tanjung Datu and started to rule the area as "Datu Merpati" while his wife took the title of "Datu Permaisuri". Meanwhile, his brother, Urei Sri became the king of Sambas after marrying a queen there. However, the Santubong area (155 km east of Tanjung Datu) was infested with man-eating crocodiles, and the people decided to wage a war on the crocodiles. Eventually, the crocodiles were driven away after suffering a heavy loss of men. The men beheaded a large crocodile of 9 fathom (about 16.4 metres) in length. The head of the crocodile was left at the Santubong beach, known today as "Batu Boyak" rock formation. The Malays then started to call the Santubong area "Negri Batu Boiak". After that, Datu Permaisuri gave birth to a son named Chipang Merpati, a daughter named Dayong Sri Bulan and a dragon. Datu Merpati then went to Sadong (78 km southeast of Santubong) and married a Dayak woman there, giving rise to a class of noblemen there. After the Merpati family went back to Batu Boiak, Chipang Merpati assumed the throne as the Raja. Meanwhile, Datu Merpati and his wife went back to Tanjung Datu to spend their retirement life there.

On the other hand, the Malays largely based their story of Datu Merapati on Hikayat Datuk Marapati, authored by Haji Mohamad Tahir bin Abdul Ghani in 1939, which is written in the Jawi script. In this version of the story, the wife of Datu Merpati gave birth to a son named Merpati Jepang, a daughter named Dayang Sri Bulan and a dragon. The large crocodile was beheaded by Datu Merpati Jepang, when he became the ruler of Santubong kingdom, because the crocodiles were mating and disturbing the evening prayer of Datu Merpati Jepang. There was once a family in Kuching who claimed to keep the dragon scale in good condition and an old woman in Santubong who claimed to keep the sword once used by Datu Merapati. Sanib Said, a former curator of Sarawak State Museum, claimed that the Santubong Kingdom lasted from 300 BCE to 1647 CE, corresponding to starting of southern Indian trade with Southeast Asia until the end of Sultanate of Sarawak. However, Sultan Tengah, who founded the Sultanate of Sarawak, despite his royal origin from Brunei, was not mentioned in an untitled poem (or syair) regarding Santubong written in 1885. Although the Malay text only mentioned agriculture as the main economic activity of Santubong, Sanib decided to link Santubong's economy to the archeological discovery of beads, precious metals, and iron there.

Sultan Tengah constructed a fortified palace in Sungai Bedil, Santubong area in 1599, turning the site into administrative capital of the Sultanate of Sarawak. The sultanate lasted until 1641 when Sultan Tengah was assassinated.

According to a legend of the Iban people, about eight generations ago (about 200 to 240 years), from 1964, an Iban warrior named Unggang went from the mouth of Saribas River to Mount Santubong. While he was halfway up the mountain, he met two beautiful goddesses from the summit named Kumang and Lulong. One of the goddesses handed him Batu Perunsut, a stone used for bathing herself, as his charm. She told Unggang that his influence extended from the Saribas river to Mount Santubong only, and the goddesses would not be responsible if Unggang decided to expand his influence southeast beyond Santubong.

In the 1850s, the Malays were driven up to Kuching owing to continual attacks from the powerful Saribas Dayaks.

In 1854, a British naturalist, Alfred Russel Wallace was staying at Santubong for a brief period during his first four months in Sarawak.

The mountain is made of sandstone, although it has been confused by many with limestone tower karst, or a volcanic plug: smaller versions of both appear not far inland. For a long time it interested those in search of gold but without success. There used to be an old theory that all the gold in the First Division of Sarawak lies in a straight line between Bau and Santubong which has some support in that there is a certain amount of gold in the mountain since fishermen in the past used to depend for their livelihood during the landas season, when the sea was too rough for fishing, by panning gold in the small mountain streams from which they could expect to gain an average of twenty dollars a month.
