= Maludam =

- Location within Borneo
- Coordinates: 1.65°N 111.03333°E
- Country: Malaysia
- State: Sarawak
- Elevation: 1 m (3.3 ft)

Maludam, Saribas is a very small town and sub district in Betong Division, Sarawak, Malaysia. It is made up of a small town including some modern longhouses with a few Malay fishing villages nearby. The majority of people are Malays, with some Ibans and Chinese. Maludam was made a district in 1985.

The main tourist attraction in the area is Maludam National Park.

Maludam is located approximately 78.2 kilometres (49 mi) east of the state capital Kuching. Neighbouring settlements include:

- Melebu 6.7 kilometres (4.2 mi) northeast
- Samarang 8.3 kilometres (5.2 mi) northeast
- Kampung Sungai Meranti 8.3 kilometres (5.2 mi) southwest
- Sapinang 11.1 kilometres (6.9 mi) east
- Kampung Teriso 13.5 kilometres (8.4 mi) south
- Kampung Paloh 16.6 kilometres (10.3 mi) northeast
