= Nyako =

Nyako is a surname. Notable people with the surname include:

- Abdul-Aziz Nyako, Nigerian senator
- Binta Nyako, Nigerian judge
- Murtala Nyako, Nigerian politician

== See also ==
- István Nyakó, Hungarian parliamentarian
