= Lubok Antu District =

District in Sri Aman division, Sarawak, Malaysia

Lubok Antu
- District
- Seal Towns of Sarawak

- Location within Malaysia
- Coordinates: 1°3′0″N 111°50′0″E
- Country: Malaysia
- State: Sarawak
- Division: Sri Aman
- District: Lubok Antu
- Seat: Lubok Antu

Government
  - Type: Council-manager government
  - Chairman: Encik Akoi Anak Ejau

Area
  - Total: 3,142.55 km^{2} (1,213.35 sq mi)

Population (2024)
  - Total: 39,079
  - Density: 12.435/km^{2} (32.208/sq mi)
- Postal code: 95900
- International dialling code prefix: +6083 (landline only)
- Website: Deprecated link at archive.today (archived 2012-12-19)

Lubok Antu District (Malay: Daerah Lubok Antu) is a district in the Sri Aman Division of the state of Sarawak, Malaysia. It borders on Indonesia and a Malaysian border crossing checkpoint is located here. The checkpoint on the Indonesian side is called the Nanga Badau Border Crossing Checkpoint located in the village of Badau, West Kalimantan. The seat of Lubok Antu District is the town of Lubok Antu.

== Demographics ==
Ethnic composition of Lubok Antu District (2024)
Ethnicities / Nationality	Percentage
Malays	0.63%
Iban	87.39%
Bidayuh	0.07%
Melanau	0.06%
Other Bumiputeras	0.04%
Chinese	11%
Indians	0%
Others	0%
Non-Malaysian	0.82%

Ethnicity	2024	
Ethnicity	Pop.	%
Malays	246	0.63%
Iban	34152	87.39%
Bidayuh	28	0.07%
Melanau	22	0.06%
Other Bumiputeras	14	0.04%
Chinese	4297	11%
Indians	0	0%
Others	0	0%
Malaysian total	38759	99.18%
Non-Malaysian	320	0.82%
Total	39079	100.00%

Historical population
Year	Pop.	±%
1990	5,120	—
1995	9,354	+82.7%
2004	14,582	+55.9%
2010	18,761	+28.7%
2015	27,385	+46.0%
2024	39,079	+42.7%

This district has about more than 39,000 people; they are predominantly Iban, and there are also some Chinese and Malay residents. Most residents are worked from agriculture, livestocks, entrepreneurship, and commercial services.

== Geography ==
The Batang Ai river runs through the district. There is a suspension bridge which leads to the village of Kampung Pasir. A dam completed in 1985 caused the displacement of thousands of people when their homes were flooded. In 2018 a suspension bridge at Nanga Kesit collapsed because of flooding.

== Government ==
Lubok Antu is governed by the Lubok Antu District Council which is a local government organisation formed under the State Government's Local Authorities Ordinance, 1956. The council has the right to implement council by-laws from enactments and ordinance as approved by the State Government which, includes taxation, rentals and finance autonomy.

The council consists of a chairman, or a chairperson, a vice-chairman, and 26 council members who are appointed by the Yang Dipertua Negeri Sarawak under section 12, Local Authorities Ordinance, 1996.

== Transport ==
=== Bus Express ===
Operating Route	Operator	Remark
Miri-Bintulu-Sibu-Sarikei-Betong-Lubok Antu	Borneo Bus	

== Climate ==
Lubok Antu has a tropical rainforest climate (Af) with heavy to very heavy rainfall year-round.

Climate data for Lubok Antu
Month	Jan	Feb	Mar	Apr	May	Jun	Jul	Aug	Sep	Oct	Nov	Dec	Year
Mean daily maximum °C (°F)	30.1 (86.2)	30.3 (86.5)	31.2 (88.2)	31.7 (89.1)	32.1 (89.8)	31.9 (89.4)	31.9 (89.4)	31.8 (89.2)	31.6 (88.9)	31.5 (88.7)	31.2 (88.2)	30.7 (87.3)	31.3 (88.4)
Daily mean °C (°F)	26.1 (79.0)	26.2 (79.2)	26.9 (80.4)	27.1 (80.8)	27.5 (81.5)	27.1 (80.8)	27.0 (80.6)	27.0 (80.6)	26.9 (80.4)	26.9 (80.4)	26.8 (80.2)	26.5 (79.7)	26.8 (80.3)
Mean daily minimum °C (°F)	22.2 (72.0)	22.2 (72.0)	22.6 (72.7)	22.6 (72.7)	22.9 (73.2)	22.4 (72.3)	22.1 (71.8)	22.2 (72.0)	22.3 (72.1)	22.4 (72.3)	22.4 (72.3)	22.3 (72.1)	22.4 (72.3)
Average rainfall mm (inches)	337 (13.3)	259 (10.2)	335 (13.2)	266 (10.5)	323 (12.7)	227 (8.9)	175 (6.9)	217 (8.5)	264 (10.4)	280 (11.0)	336 (13.2)	381 (15.0)	3,400 (133.8)
Source: Climate-Data.org

== Villages ==
- Sebeliau
