= Antoni Szczęsny Godlewski =

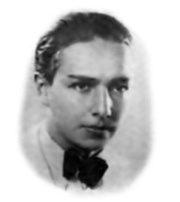
Antoni Szczęsny Godlewski in 1939

Antoni Szczęsny Godlewski, (nom-de-guerre Antek the Sprayer) (January 11, 1923 in Warsaw – August 8, 1944, in Warsaw) was a legendary soldier of the Home Army and participant in the Warsaw Uprising.

He was the son of the lawyer Franciszek and Aniela. He started high school in Warsaw but after the Nazi invasion of Poland, the Germans banned secondary education for Poles. As a result, Antoni finished his studies and obtained a high school diploma and continued his studies at an underground university of the Warsaw Polytechnic. At this time he joined the Home Army and became a member of its Security Corps.

He was killed on 8 August 1944 after the break out of the Uprising, on the corner of Bracka St. and Aleje Jerozolimskie. His place of death is marked by a memorial plaque. For his bravery in battle he was posthumously awarded the Cross of Valour and the Order of Virtuti Militari, Fifth Class. Today, a street in the Wola neighborhood of Warsaw is named after him.
