= Harriette McDougall =

British missionary (1818–1886)

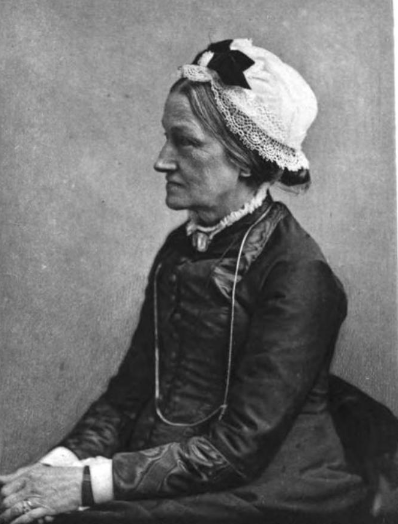
- Born: 30 August 1818; Blackfriars, London, England
- Died: 1886 (aged 67–68)
- Occupation: missionary
- Known for: her books
- Spouse: Francis McDougall

Henriette McDougall (née Bunyon, became Harriette McDougall, 30 August 1818 – 1886) was a British missionary, teacher and artist in what is now Malaysia.

== Life ==
McDougall was born in Blackfriars, London in 1818. Her elder sister, Sarah, married John Colenso and was also to be a bishop's wife. Her father, Robert John Bunyon, had an interest in an ironworks in Trimsaran in South Wales. The University of London surgeon and Oxford graduate who was overseeing the ironworks was Francis McDougall and she married him in Llanelli in July 1843. The ironworks closed the following year and her husband decided to join the church.

McDougall was offered a position as a missionary to go out to join James Brooke who had recently been installed as the White Rajah in an area of Borneo known as Sarawak. Her husband had opted instead for a position with the British Museum, but she persuaded him that they should be missionaries.

The McDougalls sailed for six months as missionaries for Borneo via the Cape and Singapore on 30 December 1847 and arrived in Sarawak on 29 June 1848. They were funded by the Borneo Church Mission. There was nothing prepared when they arrived and a first job was to build a house. In 1853 they returned to the UK as their funding from the Borneo Church Mission ended but this was replaced by funding from the Society for the Propagation of the Gospel.

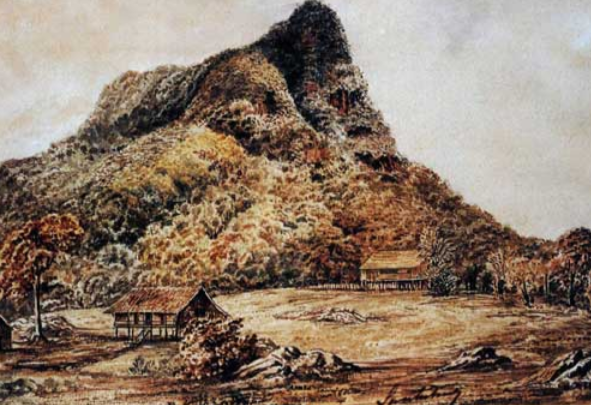
Mount Santubong in the 1850s - watercolour by Harriette McDougall

She and Francis lost five sons while she was in Sarawak and her son Charley was educated in Britain. She painted watercolours and she wrote many letters. The ones she wrote to Charley McDougall were the basis for her 1854 book Letters from Sarawak: Addressed to a Child. She had periods of home leave but basically they were in Sarawak for twenty years. They created an orphanage and schools and in return they received criticism from the White Rajah and his secretary. Parishes were established in Banting, Lundu, Bintulu, Quop and Lingga.

In 1854, Alfred Russel Wallace arrived in Borneo to collect specimens and to further his theories. He and his assistant Charles Allen stayed with the Rajah. However, when Wallace returned to Singapore Allen stayed in Sarawak and lived at the mission. Allen worked as a teacher and he returned to work for Wallace four years later.

In 1882 she published Sketches of Our Life at Sarawak which included engravings of the school and her life in Sarawak. The book records her prejudice to other religions, but it also records her view that two soldiers, Fox and Steele, killed at Kanowit by the natives in 1859 only had themselves to blame. She records the local flora and fauna and notes places like Buntal Bay which were then only home to wildlife.
