= Antek =

Antek is a Polish surname that originated as a diminutive form of the given name Antoni (a variant of Anton and Anthony).

- Samuel Antek (1909–1958), American violinist

== See also ==
- Antek Rozpylacz ('Antek the Sprayer'), the nom-de-guerre of Antoni Szczęsny Godlewski (1923–1944)
- Antek, the nom-de-guerre of Yitzhak Zuckerman, one of the leaders of the Warsaw Ghetto Uprising (1915–1981)
- Police Chief Antek, a 1935 Polish comedy film
- Antes (name)
