= Francis McDougall =

English Anglican bishop (1817–1886)

The Right Reverend Francis McDougall FRCS
- Bishop of Labuan and Sarawak
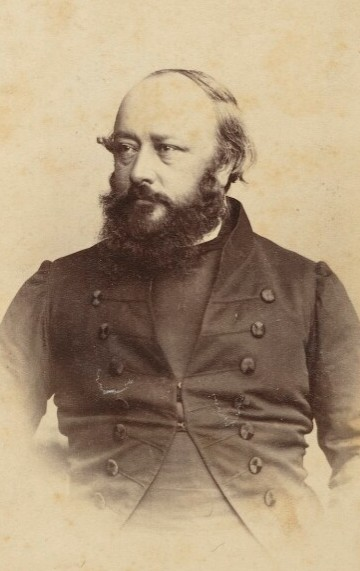
- McDougall, c. 1861

Orders
- Ordination: 1845 by Edward Stanley
- Consecration: 18 October 1855 by Daniel Wilson

Personal details
- Born: 30 June 1817 Sydenham, London, England
- Died: 16 November 1886 (aged 69)
- Spouse: Harriette McDougall (m. 1843)

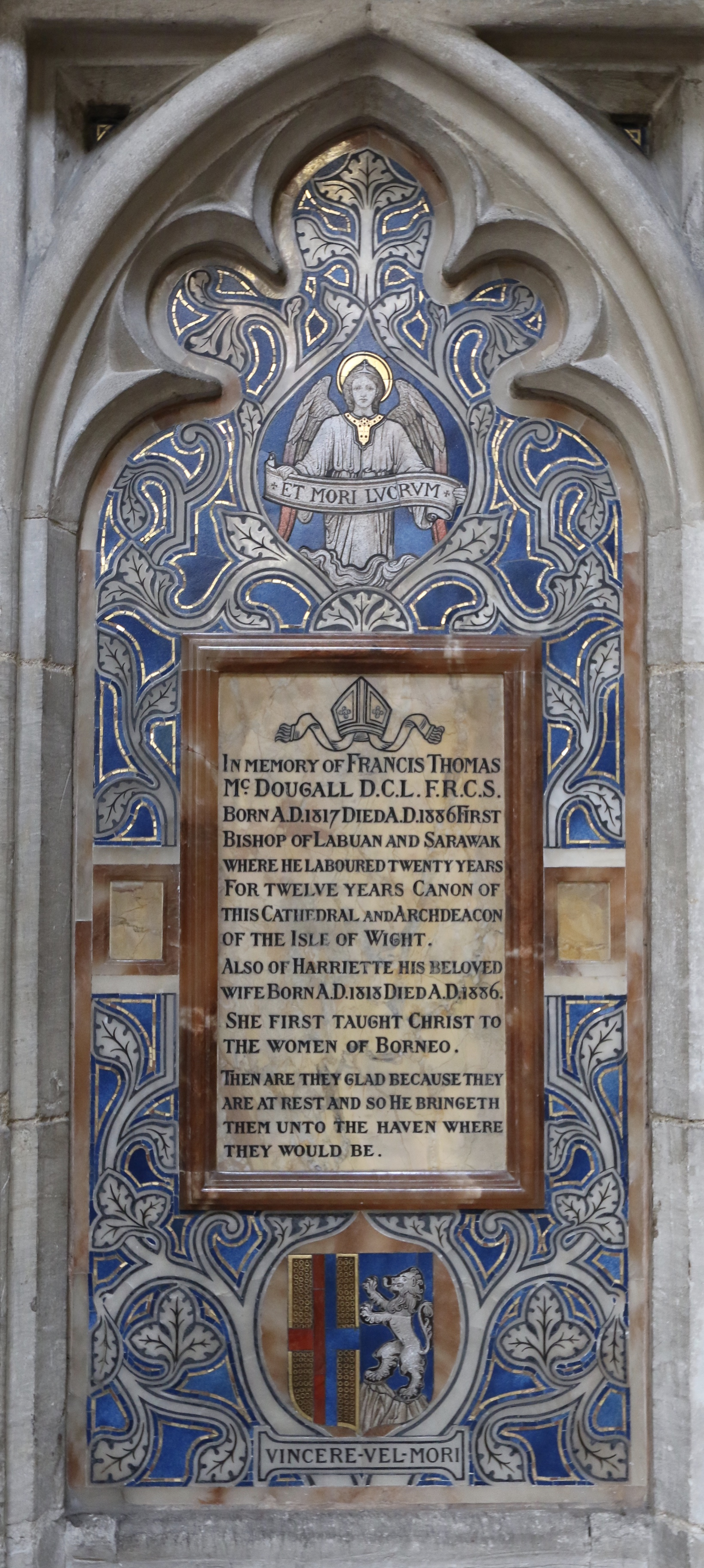
Memorial in Winchester Cathedral

Francis Thomas McDougall (30 June 1817 – 16 November 1886) was the first Bishop of Labuan and Sarawak from 1849 to 1868.

== Life ==
McDougall was born in Sydenham, son of William Adair McDougall, captain in the 88th regiment. He was educated at King's College London, where he trained as a surgeon, and Magdalen Hall, Oxford. While at Oxford, he rowed in the winning Oxford eight in the 1842 Boat Race.

On leaving Oxford, McDougall found employment in superintending the Trimsaran iron-works in South Wales, in which Robert John Bunyon had an interest; Francis married his daughter, Harriette, in Llanelli in July 1843. This was around the time of the Rebecca Riots, and McDougall was a prospective target for planning to open a company 'truck' shop. The ironworks closed in 1844 and he left to be ordained in 1845, by Edward Stanley, Bishop of Norwich.

The McDougalls sailed for Borneo via the Cape and Singapore on 30 December 1847, arrived in Sarawak on 29 June 1848. William Bodham Wright was a second missionary, who made the same journey with his family, arriving with them in Kuching in June 1848. McDougall established a medical mission. The work of setting up a school was delegated to the Wrights, but immediately proved contentious. Wright favoured co-education, which was culturally sensitive. The Wrights returned to the United Kingdom after eight months.

McDougall took over the school project. He ran a "Home School", in which children were trained from an early age in the principles of Christianity. In the end he found it not particularly rewarding. In 1853, he returned home in order to manage the transfer of the mission from the Borneo Mission Society, whose funds came to an end, to the Society for Propagating the Gospel. In 1854, he was back again in Sarawak and the work of the mission grew.

McDougall was appointed first Bishop of Labuan and Sarawak (so called because Labuan was a British territory and Sarawak was not). He was consecrated a bishop at Calcutta on St Luke's Day 1855 (18 October), by Daniel Wilson, Bishop of Calcutta (under commission from John Bird Sumner, Archbishop of Canterbury). His was "the first consecration of an English Bishop performed outside the British Isles".

Returning to England in 1868 he was appointed Vicar of Godmanchester. Later he was Archdeacon of Huntingdon, then Vicar of Milford on Sea; and finally Archdeacon of the Isle of Wight from 1874 until his death.

== See also ==
- List of Oxford University Boat Race crews
- Battle off Mukah

Church of England titles
Preceded by Inaugural appointment	Bishop of Labuan and Sarawak; 1849 – 1868	Succeeded by Walter Chambers
