= Aidel Lariwoo =

Malaysian politician

Yang Berhormat Datuk Ir. Aidel Lariwoo PGBK PBS MLA
- ايدل لاريووو

Deputy Minister for Infrastructure and Port Development
- Incumbent
- Assumed office 2022 Serving with Majang Renggi
- Governor: Abdul Taib Mahmud (2022-2024); Wan Junaidi Tuanku Jaafar (since 2024)
- Premier: Abang Johari
- Preceded by: Position established

Member of the Sarawak State Legislative Assembly for Sadong Jaya
- Incumbent
- Assumed office 2011
- Preceded by: Wan Abdul Wahab Wan Sanusi

Personal details
- Born: Aidel bin Lariwoo Sarawak
- Citizenship: Malaysian
- Party: PBB
- Other political affiliations: Barisan Nasional (till 2018); Gabungan Parti Sarawak (since 2018)
- Occupation: Politician

Aidel bin Lariwoo is a Malaysian politician from PBB. He has served as the Member of the Sarawak State Legislative Assembly for Sadong Jaya since 2021. He is also the Deputy Minister for Infrastructure and Port Development for Sarawak.

== Election results ==
Sarawak State Legislative Assembly
| Year | Constituency | Candidate | Votes | Pct. | Opponent(s) | Votes | Pct. | Ballots cast | Majority | Turnout |
|---|---|---|---|---|---|---|---|---|---|---|
| 2011 | N20 Sadong Jaya | Aidel Lariwoo (PBB) | 4,008 | 73.09% | Abang Eddy Allyanni Abang Fauzi (PAS) | 1,074 | 19.58% | 5,589 | 2,934 | 73.00% |
| 2011 | N20 Sadong Jaya | Aidel Lariwoo (PBB) | 4,008 | 73.09% | Mahayuddin Wahab (IND) | 402 | 7.33% | 5,589 | 2,934 | 73.00% |
| 2016 | N24 Sadong Jaya | Aidel Lariwoo (PBB) | 3,925 | 82.22% | Asan Singkro (PAS) | 458 | 9.59% | 4,874 | 3,467 | 72.22% |
| 2016 | N24 Sadong Jaya | Aidel Lariwoo (PBB) | 3,925 | 82.22% | Awang Rabiee Awang Hosen (IND) | 234 | 4.90% | 4,874 | 3,467 | 72.22% |
| 2016 | N24 Sadong Jaya | Aidel Lariwoo (PBB) | 3,925 | 82.22% | Othman Mustapha (AMANAH) | 157 | 3.29% | 4,874 | 3,467 | 72.22% |
| 2021 | N24 Sadong Jaya | Aidel Lariwoo (PBB) | 4,333 | 82.96% | Nur Khairunisa Abdullah (PSB) | 456 | 8.73% | 5,301 | 3,877 | 69.27% |
| 2021 | N24 Sadong Jaya | Aidel Lariwoo (PBB) | 4,333 | 82.96% | Piee Ling (PKR) | 319 | 6.11% | 5,301 | 3,877 | 69.27% |
| 2021 | N24 Sadong Jaya | Aidel Lariwoo (PBB) | 4,333 | 82.96% | Jolhi Bee (PBK) | 115 | 2.20% | 5,301 | 3,877 | 69.27% |

== Honours ==
- Sarawak
  - Commander of the Order of the Star of Hornbill Sarawak (PGBK) – Datuk (2023)
  - Officer of the Most Exalted Order of the Star of Sarawak (PBS) (2015)
