= Kampung Teriso =

- Location within Borneo
- Coordinates: 1.53333°N 111°E
- Country: Malaysia
- State: Sarawak
- Elevation: 1 m (3.3 ft)

Kampung Teriso, Saribas (also known as Kampung Triso Darat or Kampung Triso) is a coastal settlement in Sarawak, Malaysia. It lies approximately 74.4 kilometres (46 mi) east of the state capital Kuching. Neighbouring settlements include:

- Kampung Sungai Meranti 5.6 kilometres (3.5 mi) north
- Kampung Pasir Sebuyau 7.6 kilometres (4.7 mi) west
- Sebuyau 7.6 kilometres (4.7 mi) west
- Kampung Raba 7.9 kilometres (4.9 mi) southwest
- Kampung Lintang 11.3 kilometres (7.0 mi) west
- Maludam 13.5 kilometres (8.4 mi) north
