= Sri Aman District =

Sri Aman
- District
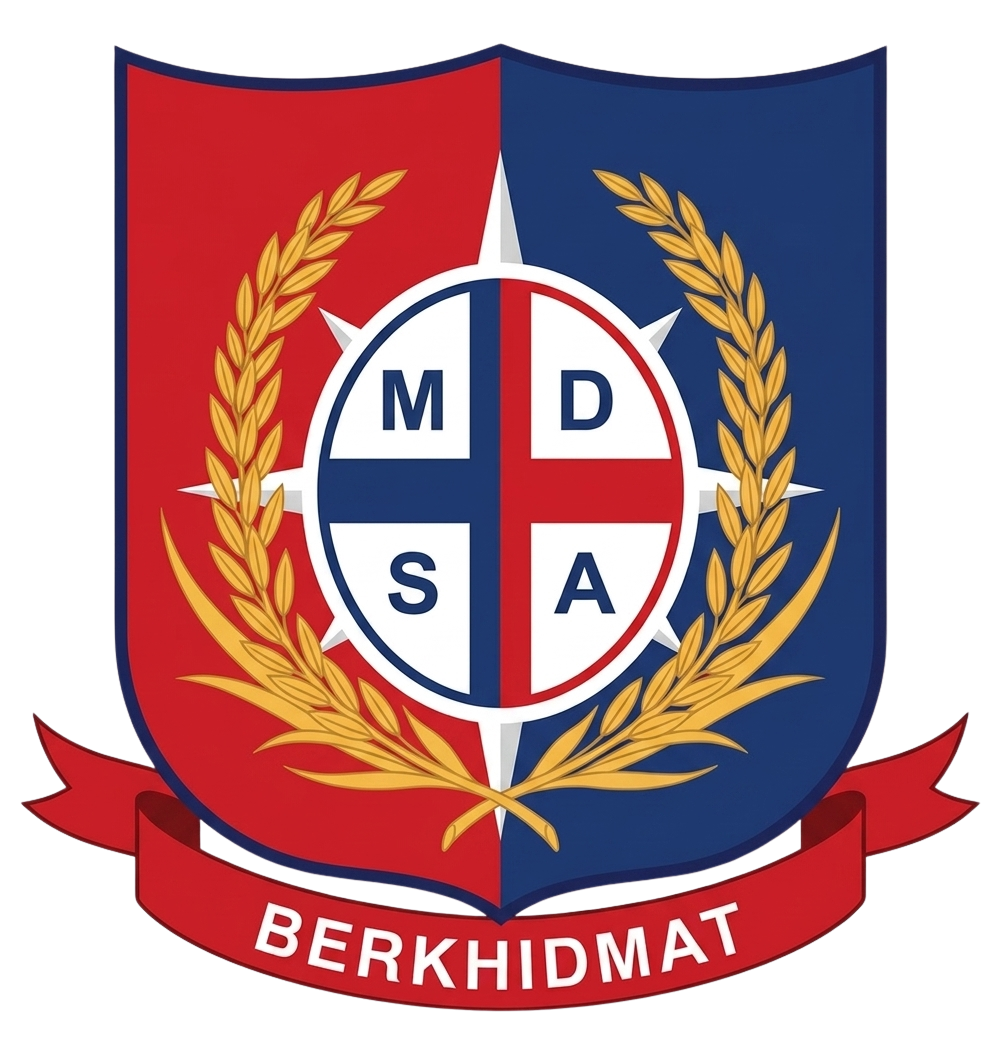
- Seal
- Country: Malaysia
- State: Sarawak
- Seat: Simanggang

Map of Sri Aman District

The Sri Aman District is one of two districts in the Sri Aman Division of Sarawak, Malaysia. It is named after its capital Simanggang (known as Sri Aman from 1974 to 2019, which means town of peace in Malay). It has a land area of 2,323.7 km^{2} (897.2 sq mi).

The district's population was 64,905 in 2010, with an ethnic composition of 62.2% Iban, 22.4% Malay, 14.1% Chinese, and 0.6% Bidayuh. Most of the Iban are farmers, while the Chinese are shopkeepers and the Malays and Bidayuhs tend to be government employees.

Agriculture is the main economic activity.
