= Lingga, Malaysia =

Town in Sarawak, Malaysia

Lingga
- Town
- Location within East Malaysia Location within Malaysia
- Coordinates: 01°21′17″N 111°10′13″E
- Country: Malaysia
- State: Sarawak
- Division: Sri Aman

Area
  - Total: 266.8 km^{2} (103.0 sq mi)
- Elevation: 3 m (9.8 ft)

Population (2020)
  - Total: 4,073
  - Density: 15.27/km^{2} (39.54/sq mi)
- Time zone: UTC+8 (MST)

Lingga is a town located in Sri Aman Division, Sarawak, Malaysia. It is located in East Malaysia, about 50 km (31 mi) northwest of the division capital Simanggang. It has a population of 4,073, as of 2020.

== Geography ==
Lingga is situated on the southern bank of Lupar River, with Seterap River running through the town. It has an average elevation of 3 m (9.8 ft) above the sea level.

== Climate ==
Lingga has a Tropical Rainforest Climate (Af). It sees the most precipitation in December, with 360 mm of average rainfall; and the least precipitation in July, with 173 mm (6.8 in) of average rainfall.

Climate data for Lingga
| Month | Jan | Feb | Mar | Apr | May | Jun | Jul | Aug | Sep | Oct | Nov | Dec | Year |
|---|---|---|---|---|---|---|---|---|---|---|---|---|---|
| Mean daily maximum °C (°F) | 28.8 (83.8) | 29.1 (84.4) | 29.7 (85.5) | 30.1 (86.2) | 30.3 (86.5) | 30.0 (86.0) | 30.0 (86.0) | 30.3 (86.5) | 29.9 (85.8) | 29.7 (85.5) | 29.3 (84.7) | 29.0 (84.2) | 29.7 (85.4) |
| Daily mean °C (°F) | 25.3 (77.5) | 25.4 (77.7) | 25.9 (78.6) | 26.2 (79.2) | 26.5 (79.7) | 26.4 (79.5) | 26.2 (79.2) | 26.3 (79.3) | 26.1 (79.0) | 25.8 (78.4) | 25.6 (78.1) | 25.4 (77.7) | 25.9 (78.7) |
| Mean daily minimum °C (°F) | 23.1 (73.6) | 23.1 (73.6) | 23.4 (74.1) | 23.8 (74.8) | 24.0 (75.2) | 23.7 (74.7) | 23.4 (74.1) | 23.5 (74.3) | 23.5 (74.3) | 23.4 (74.1) | 23.3 (73.9) | 23.3 (73.9) | 23.5 (74.2) |
| Average rainfall mm (inches) | 334 (13.1) | 271 (10.7) | 273 (10.7) | 278 (10.9) | 237 (9.3) | 192 (7.6) | 173 (6.8) | 188 (7.4) | 249 (9.8) | 304 (12.0) | 322 (12.7) | 360 (14.2) | 3,181 (125.2) |
Source: Climate-Data.org
