= Sri Aman Division =

Coordinates: 1°30′0″N 111°30′0″E

Sri Aman
- Divisions of Sarawak

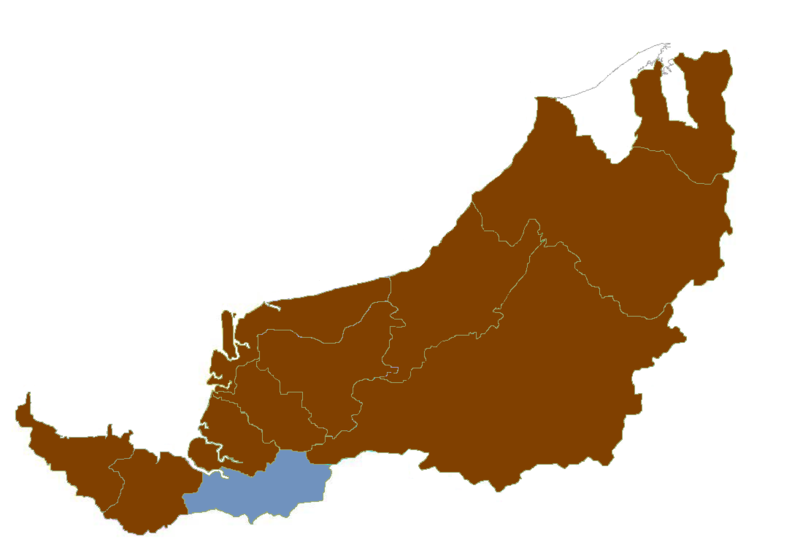
- Division Office location: Simanggang
- Local area government(s): Majlis Daerah Sri Aman (MDSA); Majlis Daerah Lubok Antu (MDLA); Pejabat Daerah Kecil Lingga; Pejabat Daerah Kecil Skrang

Population (2025)
  - Total: 164,310
- Resident: Mahra Salleh
- License plate prefix: QB

Sri Aman Division is one of the twelve administrative divisions in Sarawak, Malaysia. Formerly part of the Second Division, which included Betong, Sri Aman Division has a total area of 5,466.7 square kilometres. It was formerly known as Simanggang District.

Sri Aman Division contains two administrative districts: Sri Aman and Lubok Antu. The total population is 164,310. The population is generally culturally mixed, with Iban, Malay and Chinese predominating.

The economy of the division is mostly agricultural. Sri Aman Division is in the largest farming area of Sarawak.

The Division also contains the Batang Ai National Park and the Maludam National Park, and tourism, especially ecotourism, and cultural tourism to the Iban longhouses is an important part of the local economy.

== History ==
The Second Division of Sarawak was established on 1 June 1873. It was later renamed to Simanggang Division. The Division was renamed to Sri Aman Division in March 1974.

Sri Aman Division was originally made up of four districts, which were Sri Aman, Lubok Antu, Betong, and Saratok together with 9 smaller districts including Pantu, Lingga, Maludam, Engkilili, Spaoh, Debak, Pusa and Roban.

After the establishment of Betong Division on 26 March 2002, Sri Aman Division comprises only 2 districts and 3 smaller districts, which were Sri Aman and Lubok Antu Districts whereas the smaller districts covers Engkilili, Lingga, and Skrang.

== Administration ==
The land area of the division is 5,466.25 km^{2} and the population is around 90,000 people. The division's main economy source is agriculture, with palm oil, padi, pepper and cocoa being the main crops.

=== Members of Parliament ===
Parliament	Member of Parliament	Party
P201 Batang Lupar	YB Mohamad Shafizan Kepli	GPS (PBB)
P202 Sri Aman	YB Doris Sophia Brodi	GPS (PRS)
P203 Lubok Antu	YB Roy Angau Gingkoi	GPS (PRS)

== Demographics ==
Total population of every areas in Sri Aman, Sarawak. These population are exactly based on their ethnics in Sarawak.

Iban is the only ethnic that mostly available in Sri Aman, along with other ethnics such as Chinese, Malay, Bidayuh, Melanau, and Orang Ulu.

1. Bandar Simanggang

- Iban : 46,813
- Chinese : 15,780
- Malay : 10,214
- Bidayuh : 3,542
- Melanau : 109
- Orang Ulu : 37
- Indian : 20
- Other ethnics : –

TOTAL : 76,515

2. Melugu & Entulang

- Iban : 11,386
- Chinese : 1,302
- Malay : 1,015
- Bidayuh : 64
- Orang Ulu : –
- Melanau : –
- Indian : –
- Other ethnics : –

TOTAL : 13,767

3. Lingga

- Malay : 7,911
- Chinese : 1,546
- Iban : 1,375
- Melanau : 58
- Bidayuh : –
- Orang Ulu : –
- Indian : –
- Other ethnics : –

TOTAL : 10,890

4. Engkilili

- Iban : 21,973
- Chinese : 5,891
- Malay : 3,036
- Bidayuh : 205
- Melanau : 41
- Indian : –
- Orang Ulu : –
- Other ethnics : –

TOTAL : 31,146

5. Lubok Antu

- Iban : 26,394
- Chinese : 5,180
- Malay : 3,407
- Orang Ulu : 212
- Bidayuh : 15
- Melanau : –
- Indian : –
- Other ethnics : –

TOTAL : 35,208

6. Skrang

- Iban : 9,731
- Chinese : 86
- Orang Ulu : 13
- Malay : –
- Melanau : –
- Indian : –
- Bidayuh : –
- Other ethnics : –

TOTAL : 9,830

== Resident's Roll of Honor ==
Below is the Resident of Sri Aman Roll of Honor, dating back to its formation in 1869:

- James Brooke Cruickshank (1869–1870) – the first Resident
- Henry Skelton (1870–1873)
- Francis Richard Ord Maxwell (1872–1881)
- Henry Fitzgibbon Deshon (1879–1892)
- Demetrius James Sandford Bailey (1888–1908)
- Rajah Muda Charles Vyner Brooke (1898–1899)
- Arthur Bartlett Ward (1899–1901)
- Frederick Ambrose Wilford Page Turner (1915–1930)
- John Beville Archer (1930–1934)
- Adam Philip Mcdonald (1934–1936)
- Hugh Edward Cutfield (1936–1941) (Sarawak was then occupied by Japan from 1941 to 1945)
- J.C.H. Barcroft (1946–1947) (Sarawak became a British Colony in 1946)
- W.P.N.L. Ditmas (1947–1951)
- A.F.R. Griffin (1951–1953)
- M.J. Forster (1953–1955)
- A.J.N. Richards (1955–1962)
- J.F. Drake-Brockman (1962–1963) (Sarawak became independent, then part of Malaysia in 1963)
- G. Lloyd Thomas (1963–1965) – last foreigner to hold the position of Resident
- Peter Tinggom (1965–1967) – first local to be appointed as Resident
- William Nais (1967–1970)
- Tuan Hj Yusof Bin Tuan Hj Arbi (29.01.1970–16.02.1973)
- Tuan Hj Mohd Fauzi Bin Hj Abd Hamid (16.02.1973–19.05.1980)
- Mohd Hanis Bin Mahlie (20.05.1980–05.08.1983)
- Dr Yusoff Bin Hj Hanifah (06.08.1983–15.08.1984)
- Tuan Hj Abu Kassim Bin Hj Abd Rahim (16.06.1984–01.11.1986)
- Michael Pilo Ak Gangga (01.11.1986–20.03.1987)
- Tuan Hj Abu Kassim Bin Hj Abd Rahim (21.03.1987–30.12.1988)
- Peter Nyaed Juses(31.12.1988–19.03.1989)
- Tuan Hj Mohd Iskandar Bin Abdullah (20.03.1989–18.06.1991)
- Noel Hudson Laga (19.06.1991–02.02.1993)
- Waslie Bin Ramlie (26.02.1993–05.03.1993)
- Peter Nyaed Juses (06.03.1993–06.09.1993) – Reappointed for the 2nd time.
- Waslie Bin Ramlie (06.09.1993–15.03.1997) – also reappointed for the 2nd time.
- Salleh Bin Yusop (14.04.1997–31.12.1998)
- Ganie Ugay (02.01.1999–28.03.2000)
- Patrick Engkasan Ak Entabar @ Digat (01.03.2000–30.11.2002)
- Dr Ngenang Ak Jangu (02.12.2002–02.12.2006)
- Abg Shamshudin Bin Abg Seruji (03.01.2007–15.11.2010)
- Abd Rahman Sebli Bin Senusi (01.12.2010–04.08.2011)
