= Sebuyau =

- Location within Borneo
- Coordinates: 1°31′0″N 110°56′0″E
- Country: Malaysia
- State: Sarawak

Sebuyau is a small coastal town in Sebuyau District, Samarahan Division, Sarawak, Malaysia. Most of its inhabitants are made up of the Malay and the Iban people.

== Education ==
=== Primary school ===
- SK Tuanku Bagus Sebuyau
- SJK (C) Chung Hua Sebuyau

=== Secondary school ===
- SMK Sebuyau
