= Simanggang =

Town in east Malaysia on the Batang Lupar River

Simanggang سيمڠݢڠ
- Town and district capital
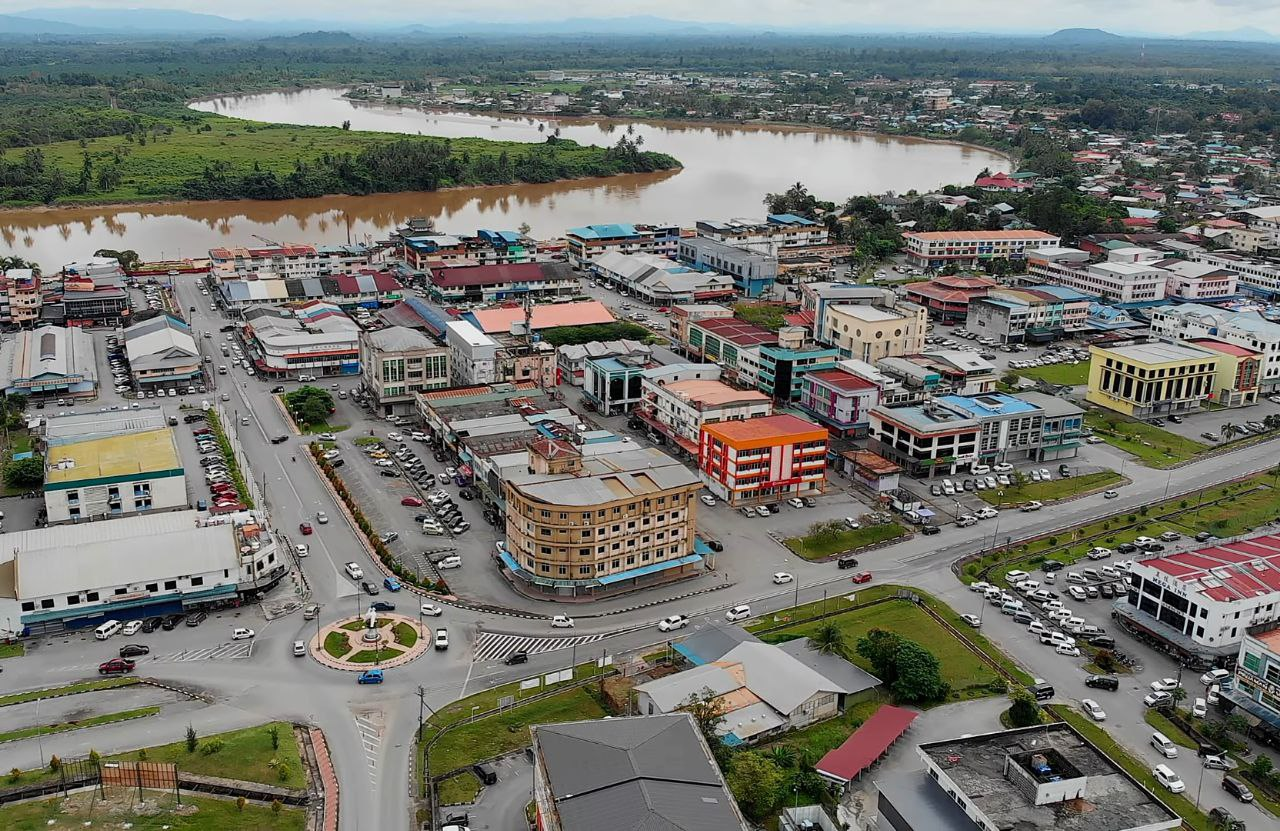
- Aerial view of Simanggang and Lupar River

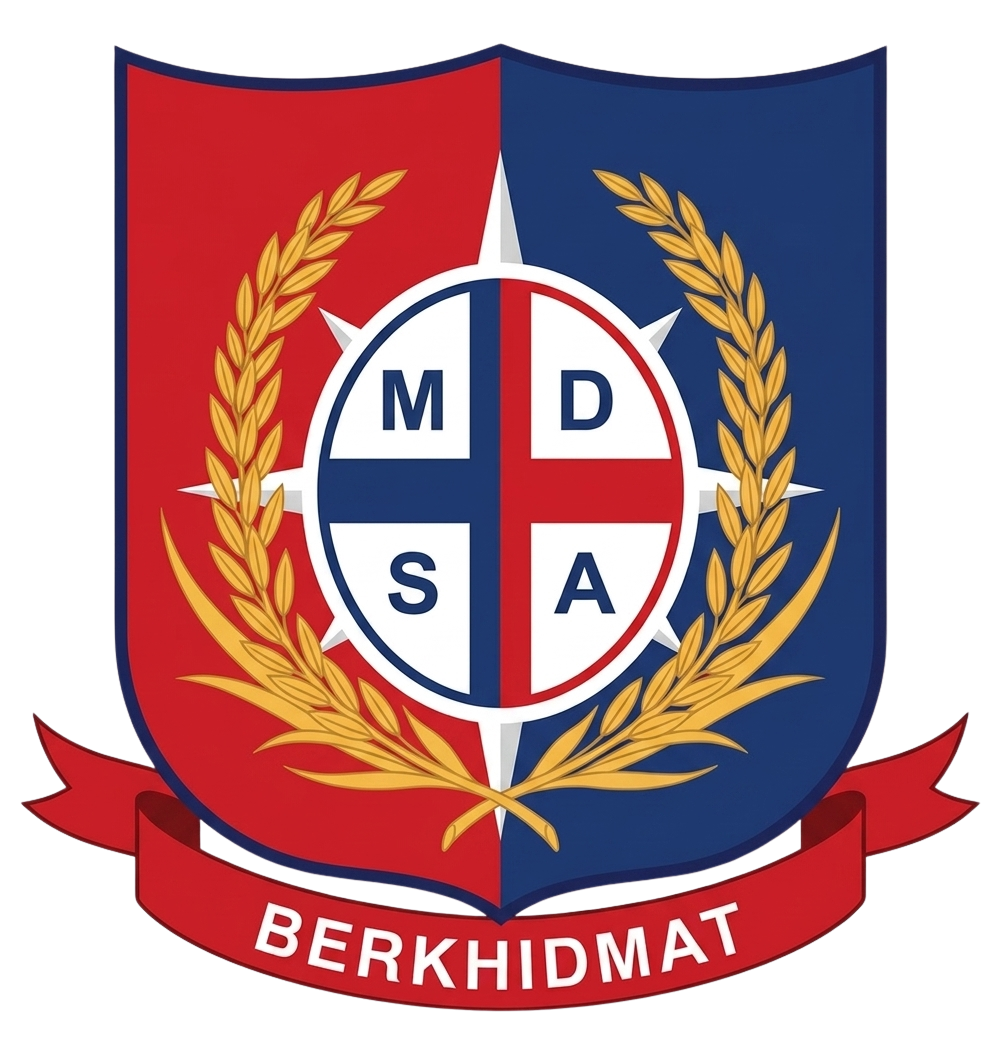
- Seal Towns of Sarawak
- Nickname: Benak Town
- Location in Malaysia
- Coordinates: 1°14′7″N 111°28′11″E
- Country: Malaysia
- State: Sarawak
- Division: Sri Aman
- District: Sri Aman
- Division Office Location: Sri Aman
- Local area government(s): Sri Aman District Council
- Postal code: 95xxx
- International dialling code prefix: +6083 (landline only)
- President: Anthony Abell Chendan
- Website: www.sriamandc.sarawak.gov.my

Sri Aman District Council Majlis Daerah Sri Aman
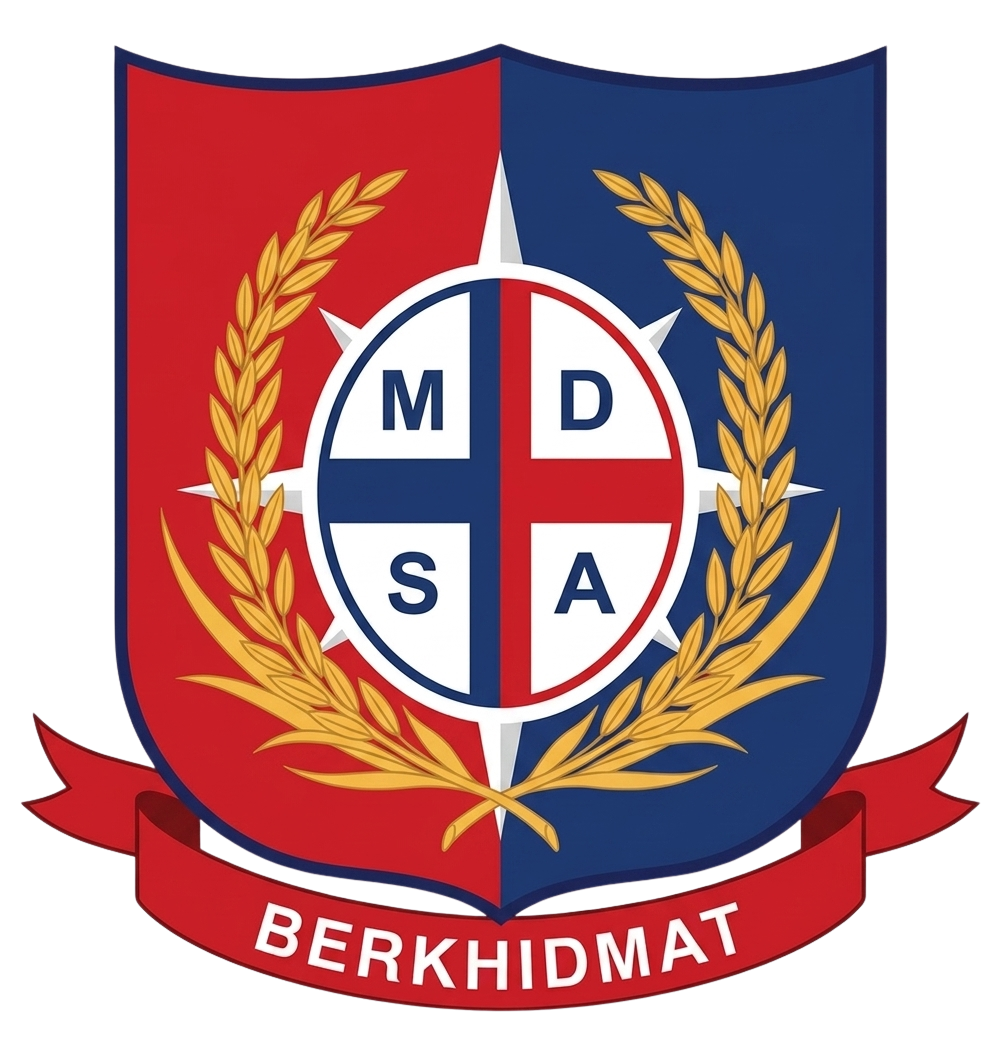

Type
- Type: Local authority

History
- Founded: 10 February 1963
- Preceded by: Batang Lupar District Council

Leadership
- President: Anthony Abell Chendan
- District Secretary: Tay Guan Huat

Motto
- Berkhidmat (Service)

Meeting place
- Peti Surat 78, 95007 Sri Aman, Sarawak.

Website
- sriamandc.sarawak.gov.my

Simanggang is a town and the capital of Sri Aman District and Sri Aman Division in Sarawak, east Malaysia. Located on the Lupar River, it is 193 kilometres (120 mi), a three-hour drive, from Kuching, the capital of Sarawak. It is a trade centre for the timber, oil palm, rubber, and pepper of its mostly agricultural district.

Simanggang is famous for the benak, or tidal bore, of the Batang Lupar River. The tidal bore comes in from the river mouth and fills up the river very rapidly in the course of about 10 minutes. The wave crest at Simanggang is up to two to three metres (7 to 10 ft) high. This is one of approximately 48 rivers and estuaries in the world where this phenomenon happens. What is special about Simanggang's benak is that it occurs every day, the only river in the world that does that.

There is a timetable at the river which has the time and dates for when the tidal bore will occur, but the really big ones occur only a couple of times a year. The author Somerset Maugham almost died at Simanggang during one of these tidal bores, an event commemorated in his short story The Yellow Streak.

Simanggang is also a gateway for tourists to the Batang Ai National Park, and cultural tours to the Iban longhouses along the rivers.

== Etymology ==
The town of Simanggang was known for the same name until 1973. Following the memorandum of understanding (MoU) signed in October 1973 between government of Sarawak and Communist members to end the armed conflict in southern Sarawak, the name of the town was changed to "Sri Aman" while the administrative division was renamed as Sri Aman Division in March 1974. Sri Aman means "town of peace" in the Malay language. In 2019, the town reverted to its old name "Simanggang" according to the wishes of the local residents. However, the administrative division retains its "Sri Aman" name.

== Economic activities ==
Agriculture, livestock, technical & vocational education, communication and multimedia, Sarawak green economy sector, public service sector, Sarawak digital economy activities, and commercial business is the most active economic activities that available in Simanggang.

== Geography ==
Simanggang has a tropical rainforest climate (Af) with heavy to very heavy rainfall year-round.

Climate data for Simanggang
| Month | Jan | Feb | Mar | Apr | May | Jun | Jul | Aug | Sep | Oct | Nov | Dec | Year |
|---|---|---|---|---|---|---|---|---|---|---|---|---|---|
| Mean daily maximum °C (°F) | 30.2 (86.4) | 30.4 (86.7) | 31.3 (88.3) | 32.0 (89.6) | 32.3 (90.1) | 32.2 (90.0) | 32.1 (89.8) | 31.9 (89.4) | 31.7 (89.1) | 31.7 (89.1) | 31.3 (88.3) | 30.8 (87.4) | 31.5 (88.7) |
| Daily mean °C (°F) | 26.3 (79.3) | 26.4 (79.5) | 27.0 (80.6) | 27.4 (81.3) | 27.6 (81.7) | 27.4 (81.3) | 27.1 (80.8) | 27.0 (80.6) | 27.0 (80.6) | 27.1 (80.8) | 26.9 (80.4) | 26.6 (79.9) | 27.0 (80.6) |
| Mean daily minimum °C (°F) | 22.4 (72.3) | 22.4 (72.3) | 22.7 (72.9) | 22.8 (73.0) | 23.0 (73.4) | 22.6 (72.7) | 22.2 (72.0) | 22.2 (72.0) | 22.4 (72.3) | 22.5 (72.5) | 22.5 (72.5) | 22.4 (72.3) | 22.5 (72.5) |
| Average rainfall mm (inches) | 324 (12.8) | 252 (9.9) | 285 (11.2) | 281 (11.1) | 265 (10.4) | 198 (7.8) | 170 (6.7) | 261 (10.3) | 264 (10.4) | 292 (11.5) | 334 (13.1) | 405 (15.9) | 3,331 (131.1) |
Source: Climate-Data.org

== Demographics ==
Total population of every areas in Sri Aman, Sarawak. These population are exactly based on their ethnics in Sarawak.

Iban is the only ethnic that mostly available in Simanggang, along with other ethnics such as Chinese, Malay, Bidayuh, Melanau, and Orang Ulu.

1. Bandar Simanggang

- Iban : 46,813
- Chinese : 15,780
- Malay : 10,214
- Bidayuh : 3,542
- Melanau : 109
- Orang Ulu : 37
- Indian : 20
- Other ethnics : –

TOTAL : 76,515

2. Melugu & Entulang

- Iban : 11,386
- Chinese : 1,302
- Malay : 1,015
- Bidayuh : 64
- Orang Ulu : –
- Melanau : –
- Indian : –
- Other ethnics : –

TOTAL : 13,767

3. Lingga

- Malay : 7,911
- Chinese : 1,546
- Iban : 1,375
- Melanau : 58
- Bidayuh : –
- Orang Ulu : –
- Indian : –
- Other ethnics : –

TOTAL : 10,890

4. Engkilili

- Iban : 21,973
- Chinese : 5,891
- Malay : 3,036
- Bidayuh : 205
- Melanau : 41
- Indian : –
- Orang Ulu : –
- Other ethnics : –

TOTAL : 31,146

5. Lubok Antu

- Iban : 26,394
- Chinese : 5,180
- Malay : 3,407
- Orang Ulu : 212
- Bidayuh : 15
- Melanau : –
- Indian : –
- Other ethnics : –

TOTAL : 35,208

6. Skrang

- Iban : 9,731
- Chinese : 86
- Orang Ulu : 13
- Malay : –
- Melanau : –
- Indian : –
- Bidayuh : –
- Other ethnics : –

TOTAL : 9,830

== Transport ==
=== Bus ===
| Route No. | Operating Route | Operator | Remark |
|---|---|---|---|
| K25 | Kuching-Sri Aman | CPL | |

== Other utilities ==
=== Education ===
==== Technical & vocational educations ====
- Sarawak Skills Development Centre, Sri Aman (fully owned by Sarawak Skills)

==== Secondary schools ====
- SMK Engkilili
- SMK Lingga
- SMK Lubok Antu
- SMK Melugu
- SMK Simanggang
- SMK Sri Aman
- SMK St Luke

==== Primary schools ====
- SJK (Cina) Chung Hua Bangkong
- SJK (Cina) Chung Hua Engkilili
- SJK (Cina) Chung Hua Lingga
- SJK (Cina) Chung Hua Pantu
- SJK (Cina) Chung Hua Simanggang
- SJK (Cina) Chung Hua Undop
- SK Abang Aing
- SK Abok
- SK Agama Sri Aman
- SK Aping
- SK Bakong
- SK Basi
- SK Batang Ai
- SK Batu Lintang
- SK Emplam
- SK Engkilili No. 1
- SK Engkilili No.2
- SK Engkranji
- SK Gran Stumbin
- SK Ijok
- SK Jaong
- SK Kem Pakit
- SK Kem Skrang
- SK Keranggas
- SK Lela Pahlawan
- SK Lubok Antu
- SK Melaban
- SK Melugu
- SK Merbong
- SK Munggu Bringin
- SK Nanga Aup
- SK Nanga Kesit
- SK Nanga Kumpang
- SK Nanga Tebat
- SK Nanga Tibu
- SK Ng Delok
- SK Ng Entalau
- SK Ng Klassen
- SK Ng Menjuau
- SK Ng Menyebat
- SK Ng Skrang
- SK Paku
- SK Pantu
- SK Pulau Seduku
- SK Ridan
- SK San Semanju
- SK Sbangki
- SK Selanjan
- SK Selepong
- SK Skarok
- SK Sri Aman
- SK St Dunstan
- SK St Lawrence
- SK St Leo Gayau
- SK St Luke
- SK St Martin
- SK St Paul
- SK Stengin Sedarat
- SK Tabut
- SK Tangjung Bijat
- SK Temudok Kem
- SK Ulu Engkari
- SK Ulu Lemanak

=== Healthcare ===
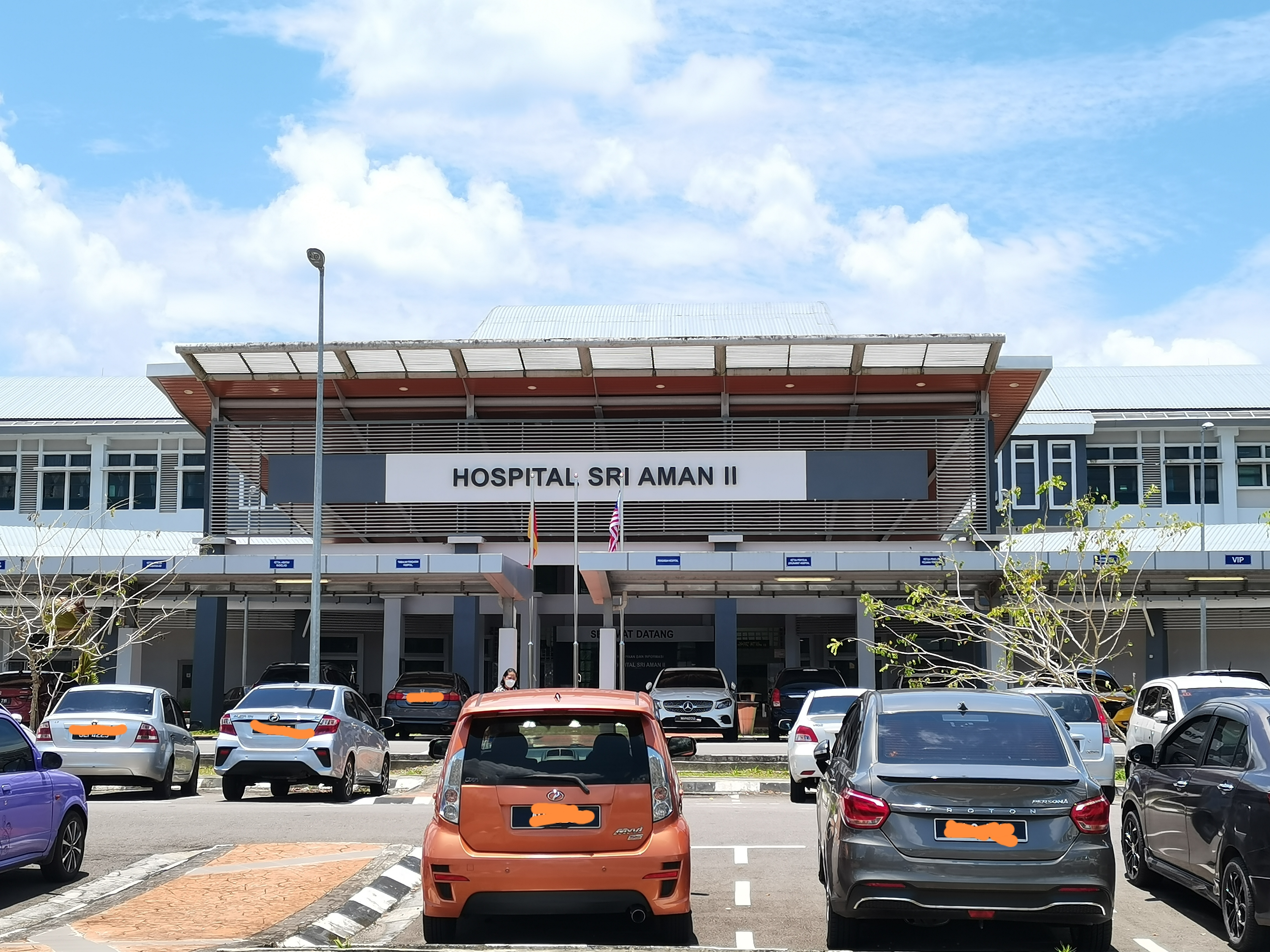
Sri Aman II hospital main building.

Sri Aman II hospital started operation since September 2022.

== Historical and conservation areas ==
=== Fort Alice ===
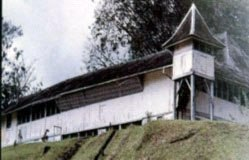
Fort Alice side view.

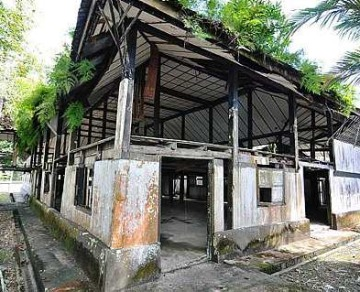
Fort Alice in 2010, before restoration work.

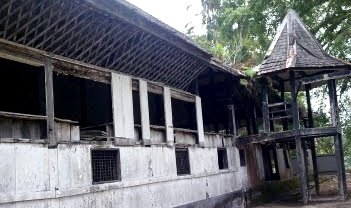
Fort Alice in 2010. The fort has since been renovated and opened as a museum in 2015.

Fort Alice, built in 1864, is the oldest heritage building in Simanggang, constructed following the victory of Rajah Charles Brooke, the second Rajah of Sarawak, over Rentap, the last of the major Iban chieftains, in 1864. The Fort was named after Charles Brooke's wife, Margaret Alice Lili de Windt. It served as a defensive structure controlling the Lupar River.

The structure was built on a strategic hilltop position and had a commanding view of the river with cannons bearing down to stop any threats coming from upriver. It played a major role in suppressing piracy, slavery, and head-hunting, while encouraging trade and expanding the authority of the Rajah. Fort Alice was the Simanggang administrative center, housing various government departments and even a prison.

It was here Rajah Charles used to preside as judge settling disputes among the local Ibans during his many visits to Simanggang. It was built entirely of belian (ironwood) timber. Much of the timber used was taken from an earlier fort, Fort James Brooke, which had been built further upriver in Nanga Skrang. However, Fort James was built on lowland and was hard to defend, as was proven in 1853 when one of the Rajah's officers, Alan Lee, died in an attack by the Iban chieftain Rentap.

It was decided to dismantle Fort James and to rebuild it in a more strategic and more defensible site in Simanggang District (now Sri Aman Division). Thus Fort Alice was built. Most of the original structure remains substantially intact, but it is in an extremely dilapidated and run down condition and in need of urgent restoration work. Many articles have been written to highlight the sorry state of the grand old lady. Restoration for the fort had been done in April 2015 and been changed into a museum.
