= List of schools in Sarawak =

This is a list of schools in Sarawak, Malaysia. It is categorised according to the variants of schools in Malaysia, and is arranged alphabetically.

== Private (Chinese) High Schools ==
- Batu Kawa Min Lit Secondary School, Kuching 石角民立中学
- Catholic High School 诗巫公教中学
- Chung Hua Middle School No.1 古晋中华第一中学
- Chung Hua Middle School No.3 古晋中华第三中学
- Chung Hua Middle School No.4 古晋中华第四中学
- Citizen Middle School 诗巫公民中学
- Guong Ming Middle School 诗巫光民中学
- Kai Dee Middle School, Bintulu 民都鲁开智中学
- Kiang Hin Middle School 诗巫建兴中学
- Ming Lik Secondary School 泗里街民立中学
- Pei Min Middle School 美里培民中学
- Riam Road Secondary School, Miri 美里廉律中学
- Serian Public Secondary School, Samarahan 西连民众中学
- Wong Nai Siong Secondary School 诗巫黄乃裳中学

== Chinese National Primary Schools ==
- Sekolah Jenis Kebangsaan (C) Chung Hua, Lutong, Kuching
- Sekolah Jenis Kebangsaan (C) Chung Hua, Sejijak, Kuching
- Sekolah Jenis Kebangsaan (C) St. Paul, Kuching
- Sekolah Jenis Kebangsaan (C) Chung Hua Betong, Kuching
- Sekolah Jenis Kebangsaan (C) Chung Hua, Bintulu 中华公学
- Sekolah Jenis Kebangsaan (C) Chung Hua, Tatau, Bintulu 中华达岛小学
- Sekolah Jenis Kebangsaan (C) Sebiew Chinese, Bintulu 实比河小学
- Sekolah Jenis Kebangsaan (C) Chung Hua No.2, Bintulu 中华公学二校
- Sekolah Jenis Kebangsaan (C) Siong Boon, Bintulu 尚文小学
- Sekolah Jenis Kebangsaan (C) Chung San, Sebauh, Bintulu 中山小学
- Sekolah Jenis Kebangsaan (C) Hin Hua, Song 桑县兴华小学
- Sekolah Jenis Kebangsaan (C) Hock Lam, Kapit
- Sekolah Jenis Kebangsaan (C) Bintawa, Kuching
- Sekolah Jenis Kebangsaan (C) Chung Hua Batu 10, Kuching
- Sekolah Jenis Kebangsaan (C) Chung Hua Batu 4 1/2, Kuching
- Sekolah Jenis Kebangsaan (C) Chung Hua Batu 7, Kuching
- Sekolah Jenis Kebangsaan (C) Chung Hua Batu 8 1/2, Kuching
- Sekolah Jenis Kebangsaan (C) Chung Hua Batu Kawa, Kuching
- Sekolah Jenis Kebangsaan (C) Chung Hua Kranji, Kuching
- Sekolah Jenis Kebangsaan (C) Chung Hua Lundu, Kuching
- Sekolah Jenis Kebangsaan (C) Chung Hua No. 1, Kuching 中华小学第一校
- Sekolah Jenis Kebangsaan (C) Chung Hua No. 2, Kuching 中华小学第二校
- Sekolah Jenis Kebangsaan (C) Chung Hua No. 3, Kuching 中华小学第三校
- Sekolah Jenis Kebangsaan (C) Chung Hua No. 4, Kuching 中华小学第四校
- Sekolah Jenis Kebangsaan (C) Chung Hua No. 5, Kuching 中华小学第五校
- Sekolah Jenis Kebangsaan (C) Chung Hua No. 6, Kuching 中华小学第六校
- Sekolah Jenis Kebangsaan (C) Chung Hua Sebuku, Kuching
- Sekolah Jenis Kebangsaan (C) Chung Hua Siburan, Kuching
- Sekolah Jenis Kebangsaan (C) Chung Hua Stampin, Kuching
- Sekolah Jenis Kebangsaan (C) Chung Hua Stapok, Kuching
- Sekolah Jenis Kebangsaan (C) Chung Hua Sungai Buda, Kuching
- Sekolah Jenis Kebangsaan (C) Chung Hua Sungai Lubak, Kuching
- Sekolah Jenis Kebangsaan (C) Chung Hua Sungai Moyan, Kuching
- Sekolah Jenis Kebangsaan (C) Kenyalang, Kuching
- Sekolah Jenis Kebangsaan (C) Lumba Kuda, Kuching
- Sekolah Jenis Kebangsaan (C) Sam Hap Hin, Kuching
- Sekolah Jenis Kebangsaan (C) Song Sheng Hai, Kuching
- Sekolah Jenis Kebangsaan (C) Stampin, Kuching
- Sekolah Jenis Kebangsaan (C) Sungai Apong, Kuching
- Sekolah Jenis Kebangsaan (C) Sungai Tengah, Kuching
- Sekolah Jenis Kebangsaan (C) Tapah, Kuching
- Sekolah Jenis Kebangsaan (C) Chung Hwa Lawas, Limbang
- Sekolah Jenis Kebangsaan (C) Chung Hwa Limbang
- Sekolah Jenis Kebangsaan (C) Chee Mung, Miri
- Sekolah Jenis Kebangsaan (C) Chung Hua Bakam, Miri
- Sekolah Jenis Kebangsaan (C) Chung Hua Krokop, Miri
- Sekolah Jenis Kebangsaan (C) Chung Hua Lutong, Miri
- Sekolah Jenis Kebangsaan (C) Chung Hua Miri
- Sekolah Jenis Kebangsaan (C) Chung Hua Pujut, Miri
- Sekolah Jenis Kebangsaan (C) Chung Hua Sibuti, Miri
- Sekolah Jenis Kebangsaan (C) Chung San, Miri
- Sekolah Jenis Kebangsaan (C) North, Miri
- Sekolah Jenis Kebangsaan (C) Sungai Jaong Chinese, Miri
- Sekolah Jenis Kebangsaan (C) Tukau, Miri
- Sekolah Jenis Kebangsaan (C) Chin Hua, Mukah
- Sekolah Jenis Kebangsaan (C) Chong Boon, Mukah
- Sekolah Jenis Kebangsaan (C) Chung Hua Balingian, Mukah
- Sekolah Jenis Kebangsaan (C) Chung Hua Batu 29, Samarahan
- Sekolah Jenis Kebangsaan (C) Chung Hua Batu 32, Samarahan
- Sekolah Jenis Kebangsaan (C) Chung Hua Serian, Samarahan
- Sekolah Jenis Kebangsaan (C) Chung Hua Semera, Samarahan
- Sekolah Jenis Kebangsaan (C) Chung Hua Asajaya, Samarahan
- Sekolah Jenis Kebangsaan (C) Sungai Menyan, Samarahan
- Sekolah Jenis Kebangsaan (C) Bulat, Sarikei
- Sekolah Jenis Kebangsaan (C) Chung Hien, Sarikei
- Sekolah Jenis Kebangsaan (C) Kai Chung, Sarikei
- Sekolah Jenis Kebangsaan (C) Kai Ming, Sarikei
- Sekolah Jenis Kebangsaan (C) Kwang Chien, Sarikei
- Sekolah Jenis Kebangsaan (C) Min Daik, Sarikei
- Sekolah Jenis Kebangsaan (C) Ming Tee, Sarikei
- Sekolah Jenis Kebangsaan (C) Siung Hua, Sarikei
- Sekolah Jenis Kebangsaan (C) St. Martin, Sarikei
- Sekolah Jenis Kebangsaan (C) Su Hing, Sarikei
- Sekolah Jenis Kebangsaan (C) Su Kwong, Sarikei
- Sekolah Jenis Kebangsaan (C) Su Lee, Sarikei
- Sekolah Jenis Kebangsaan (C) Su Ming, Sarikei
- Sekolah Jenis Kebangsaan (C) Tiong Ho, Sarikei
- Sekolah Jenis Kebangsaan (C) Tung Kwong, Sarikei
- Sekolah Jenis Kebangsaan (C) Wah Man, Sarikei
- Sekolah Jenis Kebangsaan (C) Bandaran Sibu No. 4, Sibu
- Sekolah Jenis Kebangsaan (C) Boi Ing, Sibu 培英小学
- Sekolah Jenis Kebangsaan (C) Chao Su, Sibu 超俗小学
- Sekolah Jenis Kebangsaan (C) Chung Cheng, Sibu 中正小学
- Sekolah Jenis Kebangsaan (C) Chung Hua, Sibu 中华小学
- Sekolah Jenis Kebangsaan (C) Chung Sing, Sibu 中心小学
- Sekolah Jenis Kebangsaan (C) Chung Ung, Sibu 崇文小学
- Sekolah Jenis Kebangsaan (C) Dung Sang, Sibu
- Sekolah Jenis Kebangsaan (C) Ek Thei, Sibu
- Sekolah Jenis Kebangsaan (C) Guong Ann, Sibu
- Sekolah Jenis Kebangsaan (C) Guong Ming, Sibu
- Sekolah Jenis Kebangsaan (C) Ing Guong, Sibu
- Sekolah Jenis Kebangsaan (C) Kai Nang, Sibu
- Sekolah Jenis Kebangsaan (C) Kiew Nang, Sibu
- Sekolah Jenis Kebangsaan (C) Kwong Hua, Sibu
- Sekolah Jenis Kebangsaan (C) Methodist Sibu
- Sekolah Jenis Kebangsaan (C) Nang Sang, Sibu
- Sekolah Jenis Kebangsaan (C) Sacred Heart Chinese Sibu
- Sekolah Jenis Kebangsaan (C) Su Lai, Sibu
- Sekolah Jenis Kebangsaan (C) Taman Rajang, Sibu
- Sekolah Jenis Kebangsaan (C) Thian Chin, Sibu
- Sekolah Jenis Kebangsaan (C) Thian Hua, Sibu
- Sekolah Jenis Kebangsaan (C) Tiong Hin, Sibu
- Sekolah Jenis Kebangsaan (C) Tung Hua, Sibu
- Sekolah Jenis Kebangsaan (C) Uk Daik, Sibu
- Sekolah Jenis Kebangsaan (C) Ung Nang, Sibu
- Sekolah Jenis Kebangsaan (C) Chung Hua Simanggang, Sri Aman

== Islamic National Primary Schools ==
- Sekolah Kebangsaan (A) Ibnu Khaldun, Kota Samarahan
- Sekolah Kebangsaan (A) Datuk Haji Abdul Kadir Hassan, Kuching
- Sekolah Kebangsaan (A) Bintulu
- Sekolah Kebangsaan (A) Lawas, Limbang
- Sekolah Kebangsaan (A) Miri
- Sekolah Kebangsaan (A) Sarikei
- Sekolah Kebangsaan (A) Sibu
- Sekolah Kebangsaan (A) Sri Aman

== National Primary Schools ==
=== Betong Division ===
- Sekolah Kebangsaan Abang Abdul Kadir, Betong
- Sekolah Kebangsaan Abang Abdul Rahman, Betong
- Sekolah Kebangsaan Abang Leman, Betong
- Sekolah Kebangsaan Abang Moh Sessang, Betong
- Sekolah Kebangsaan Bungin, Betong
- Sekolah Kebangsaan Datuk Bandar, Betong
- Sekolah Kebangsaan Dit Debak, Betong
- Sekolah Kebangsaan Engkabang, Betong
- Sekolah Kebangsaan Engkudu, Betong
- Sekolah Kebangsaan Kalok Pusa, Betong
- Sekolah Kebangsaan Kampung Alit, Betong
- Sekolah Kebangsaan Kampung Emplam, Betong
- Sekolah Kebangsaan Maludam, Betong
- Sekolah Kebangsaan Semarang Pusa, Betong
- Sekolah Kebangsaan Serabang, Betong
- Sekolah Kebangsaan Spaoh, Betong
- Sekolah Kebangsaan St. Augustine Betong
- Sekolah Kebangsaan St. Christopher Debak, Betong
- Sekolah Kebangsaan St. Paul Roban, Betong
- Sekolah Kebangsaan St. Peter Saratok, Betong
- Sekolah Kebangsaan St. John Nanga Tiga, Betong
- Sekolah Kebangsaan Sungai Klampai, Betong
- Sekolah Kebangsaan To' Eman, Betong
- Sekolah Kebangsaan Orang Kaya Temenggong Tanduk, Saratok.

=== Bintulu Division ===
- Sekolah Kebangsaan Asyakirin, Bintulu
- Sekolah Kebangsaan Bintulu
- Sekolah Kebangsaan Kampung Baru Bintulu
- Sekolah Kebangsaan Kampung Jepak, Bintulu
- Sekolah Kebangsaan Kampung Nyalau, Bintulu
- Sekolah Kebangsaan Kidurong, Bintulu
- Sekolah Kebangsaan Kidurong 2, Bintulu
- Sekolah Kebangsaan Orang Kaya Mohammad, Bintulu
- Sekolah Kebangsaan Sri Samalaju, Bintulu
- Sekolah Kebangsaan St. Anthony Bintulu
- Sekolah Kebangsaan Sungai Tisang, Bintulu
- Sekolah Kebangsaan Kem Batu 18, Bintulu
- Sekolah Kebangsaan Tanjung Batu, Bintulu
- Sekolah Kebangsaan Sebauh, Bintulu
- Sekolah Kebangsaan Tatau, Bintulu

=== Kapit Division ===
- Sekolah Kebangsaan Abun Matu, Kapit
- Sekolah Kebangsaan Batu Keling, Kapit
- Sekolah Kebangsaan Cardinal Vaughan, Kapit
- Sekolah Kebangsaan Kampung Baru Kapit
- Sekolah Kebangsaan Kapit
- Sekolah Kebangsaan Methodist Kapit
- Sekolah Kebangsaan Nanga Bawai, Kapit
- Sekolah Kebangsaan Nanga Bena, Kapit
- Sekolah Kebangsaan Nanga Nyimoh, Kapit
- Sekolah Kebangsaan Nanga Sama, Kapit
- Sekolah Kebangsaan Nanga Stapang, Kapit
- Sekolah Kebangsaan Punan Ba, Kapit
- Sekolah Kebangsaan Sungai Amang, Kapit
- Sekolah Kebangsaan Temenggong Koh, Kapit
- Sekolah Kebangsaan Ulu Yong, Kapit
- Sekolah Kebangsaan Lepong Gaat, Kapit
- Sekolah Kebangsaan Lepong Menuan, Kapit
- Sekolah Kebangsaan Nanga Balang, Kapit
- Sekolah Kebangsaan Nanga Sempili, Kapit
- Sekolah Kebangsaan Rantau Panjai, Kapit

=== Kuching Division ===
- Sekolah Kebangsaan Apar, Kuching
- Sekolah Kebangsaan Astana, Kuching
- Sekolah Kebangsaan Atas, Kuching
- Sekolah Kebangsaan Bandar Samariang, Kuching
- Sekolah Kebangsaan Batu Lintang, Kuching
- Sekolah Kebangsaan Bau, Kuching
- Sekolah Kebangsaan Bumiputera, Kuching
- Sekolah Kebangsaan Buntal, Kuching
- Sekolah Kebangsaan Catholic English Kuching
- Sekolah Kebangsaan Encik Buyong, Kuching
- Sekolah Kebangsaan Garland, Kuching
- Sekolah Kebangsaan Gersik, Kuching
- Sekolah Kebangsaan Gita, Kuching
- Sekolah Kebangsaan Gita No. 2, Kuching
- Sekolah Kebangsaan Goebilt, Kuching
- Sekolah Kebangsaan Green Road, Kuching
- Sekolah Kebangsaan Grogo, Kuching
- Sekolah Kebangsaan Gumbang, Kuching
- Sekolah Kebangsaan Holy Name, Kuching
- Sekolah Kebangsaan Jalan Arang, Kuching
- Sekolah Kebangsaan Jalan Haji Baki, Kuching
- Sekolah Kebangsaan Jalan Ong Tiang Swee, Kuching
- Sekolah Kebangsaan Kampung Bobak / Sejinjang, Kuching
- Sekolah Kebangsaan Kenyalang, Kuching
- Sekolah Kebangsaan Laksamana, Kuching
- Sekolah Kebangsaan Lumba Kuda, Kuching
- Sekolah Kebangsaan Madrasah Dhak Hassan, Kuching
- Sekolah Kebangsaan Major Jeneral Datu Ibrahim, Kuching
- Sekolah Kebangsaan Matang, Kuching
- Sekolah Kebangsaan Matang Jaya, Kuching
- Sekolah Kebangsaan Matu Baru, Kuching
- Sekolah Kebangsaan Merpati Jepang, Kuching
- Sekolah Kebangsaan Opar, Kuching
- Sekolah Kebangsaan Pajar Sejingkat, Kuching
- Sekolah Kebangsaan Pangkalan Kuud, Kuching
- Sekolah Kebangsaan Paon / Temaga, Kuching
- Sekolah Kebangsaan Pedaun Bawah, Kuching
- Sekolah Kebangsaan Petra Jaya, Kuching
- Sekolah Kebangsaan Pueh, Kuching
- Sekolah Kebangsaan Pulo, Kuching
- Sekolah Kebangsaan Puruh Karu, Kuching
- Sekolah Kebangsaan Rakyat Jalan Haji Bolhassan, Kuching
- Sekolah Kebangsaan Rakyat Tupong, Kuching
- Sekolah Kebangsaan Rambungan, Kuching
- Sekolah Kebangsaan Rampangi, Kuching
- Sekolah Kebangsaan Raso, Kuching
- Sekolah Kebangsaan RPR Jalan Astana, Kuching
- Sekolah Kebangsaan Sacred Heart Padawan, Kuching
- Sekolah Kebangsaan Sampadi, Kuching
- Sekolah Kebangsaan Santubong, Kuching
- Sekolah Kebangsaan Satria Jaya, Kuching
- Sekolah Kebangsaan Sebako, Kuching
- Sekolah Kebangsaan Sebat, Kuching
- Sekolah Kebangsaan Sebiris, Kuching
- Sekolah Kebangsaan Segong, Kuching
- Sekolah Kebangsaan Sejijak, Kuching
- Sekolah Kebangsaan Selampit, Kuching
- Sekolah Kebangsaan Sematan, Kuching
- Sekolah Kebangsaan Semenggok, Kuching
- Sekolah Kebangsaan Semerah Padi, Kuching
- Sekolah Kebangsaan Senibong, Kuching
- Sekolah Kebangsaan Serasot, Kuching
- Sekolah Kebangsaan Serumbu, Kuching
- Sekolah Kebangsaan Simpang Kuda, Kuching
- Sekolah Kebangsaan Siol Kanan, Kuching
- Sekolah Kebangsaan Sira / Krian, Kuching
- Sekolah Kebangsaan Song Seng Kheng Hai, Kuching
- Sekolah Kebangsaan St. Alban Duras, Kuching
- Sekolah Kebangsaan St. Andrew Kuching
- Sekolah Kebangsaan St. Augustine Padawan, Kuching
- Sekolah Kebangsaan St. Elizabeth Padawan, Kuching
- Sekolah Kebangsaan St. Faith Sekama, Kuching
- Sekolah Kebangsaan St. George, Kuching
- Sekolah Kebangsaan St. Gregory, Kuching
- Sekolah Kebangsaan St. James Quop, Kuching
- Sekolah Kebangsaan St. John Bau, Kuching
- Sekolah Kebangsaan St. Joseph Kuching
- Sekolah Kebangsaan St. Mary Kuching
- Sekolah Kebangsaan St. Matthew, Kuching
- Sekolah Kebangsaan St. Patrick Bau, Kuching
- Sekolah Kebangsaan St. Patrick Padawan, Kuching
- Sekolah Kebangsaan St. Paul Padawan, Kuching
- Sekolah Kebangsaan St. Stephen Bau, Kuching
- Sekolah Kebangsaan St. Teresa Bau, Kuching
- Sekolah Kebangsaan St. Teresa Kuching
- Sekolah Kebangsaan St. Teresa Padungan, Kuching
- Sekolah Kebangsaan St. Thomas Kuching
- Sekolah Kebangsaan Stapok, Kuching
- Sekolah Kebangsaan Stass, Kuching
- Sekolah Kebangsaan Stunggang Melayu
- Sekolah Kebangsaan Stungkor, Kuching
- Sekolah Kebangsaan Suba Buan, Kuching
- Sekolah Kebangsaan Sungai Maong Hilir Kuching
- Sekolah Kebangsaan Sungai Pinang, Kuching
- Sekolah Kebangsaan Sungai Stutong, Kuching
- Sekolah Kebangsaan Tabuan, Kuching
- Sekolah Kebangsaan Tabuan Hilir, Kuching
- Sekolah Kebangsaan Tan Sri Datuk Haji Mohamed, Kuching
- Sekolah Kebangsaan Tanjung Bako, Kuching
- Sekolah Kebangsaan Temenggong, Kuching
- Sekolah Kebangsaan Buso, Bau
- Sekolah Kebangsaan Tringgus, Kuching

=== Limbang Division ===
- Sekolah Kebangsaan, Limbang
- Sekolah Kebangsaan, Limbang
- Sekolah Kebangsaan Bandar Limbang
- Sekolah Kebangsaan Batu Empat, Limbang
- Sekolah Kebangsaan, Limbang
- Sekolah Kebangsaan Kerangan, Limbang
- Sekolah Kebangsaan Ladang Baru, Limbang
- Sekolah Kebangsaan Limbang
- Sekolah Kebangsaan Limpaki, Limbang
- Sekolah Kebangsaan Long Napir, Limbang
- Sekolah Kebangsaan Long Tukon, Limbang
- Sekolah Kebangsaan Long Tuma, Limbang
- Sekolah Kebangsaan Melayu Pusat, Limbang
- Sekolah Kebangsaan Menuang, Limbang
- Sekolah Kebangsaan Meritam, Limbang
- Sekolah Kebangsaan Pengkalan Jawa, Limbang
- Sekolah Kebangsaan Pusat Lawas, Limbang
- Sekolah Kebangsaan Kampung Pahlawan, Limbang
- Sekolah Kebangsaan St. Edmund, Limbang
- Sekolah Kebangsaan Batu Danau, Limbang
- Sekolah Kebangsaan Sungai Poyan, Limbang
- Sekolah Kebangsaan Telahak, Limbang
- Sekolah Kebangsaan Tiga Kampung, Limbang
- Sekolah Kebangsaan Ulu Lubai, Limbang

=== Miri Division ===
- Sekolah Kebangsaan Anchi, Miri
- Sekolah Kebangsaan Batu Niah, Miri
- Sekolah Kebangsaan Bekenu, Miri
- Sekolah Kebangsaan Dato Sharif Hamid, Miri
- Sekolah Kebangsaan Good Shepherd, Miri
- Sekolah Kebangsaan Jalan Bintang, Miri
- Sekolah Kebangsaan Kampung Bakam, Miri
- Sekolah Kebangsaan Kampung Luak, Miri
- Sekolah Kebangsaan Selanyau, Miri
- Sekolah Kebangsaan Kelapa Sawit No. 1, Miri
- Sekolah Kebangsaan Kita, Miri
- Sekolah Kebangsaan Kuala Baram Ii, Miri
- Sekolah Kebangsaan Lambir Village, Miri
- Sekolah Kebangsaan Lepong Ajai, Miri
- Sekolah Kebangsaan Long Ikang, Miri
- Sekolah Kebangsaan Long Lapok, Miri
- Sekolah Kebangsaan Long Laput, Miri
- Sekolah Kebangsaan Long Loyang, Miri
- Sekolah Kebangsaan Long, Miri
- Sekolah Kebangsaan Long Naah, Miri
- Sekolah Kebangsaan Long Pillah, Miri
- Sekolah Kebangsaan Long Teran Kanan, Miri
- Sekolah Kebangsaan Lutong, Miri
- Sekolah Kebangsaan Merbau, Miri
- Sekolah Kebangsaan Pengarah Enteri, Miri
- Sekolah Kebangsaan Poyut, Miri
- Sekolah Kebangsaan Pujut Corner, Miri
- Sekolah Kebangsaan Pulau Melayu, Miri
- Sekolah Kebangsaan Riam Batu Dua, Miri
- Sekolah Kebangsaan Senadin, Miri
- Sekolah Kebangsaan South, Miri
- Sekolah Kebangsaan St. Columba, Miri
- Sekolah Kebangsaan St. Joseph, Miri
- Sekolah Kebangsaan St. Pius Long San, Miri
- Sekolah Kebangsaan Sungai Entulang, Miri
- Sekolah Kebangsaan Sungai Seputi, Miri
- Sekolah Kebangsaan Sungai Saeh, Niah (Miri)
- Sekolah Kebangsaan Temala Kem Plywood, Miri
- Sekolah Kebangsaan Temenggong Datuk Muip, Miri
- Sekolah Kebangsaan Tudan, Miri

=== Mukah Division ===
- Sekolah Kebangsaan Abang Gesa, Mukah
- Sekolah Kebangsaan Bawang / Tian, Mukah
- Sekolah Kebangsaan Camporan Daro, Mukah
- Sekolah Kebangsaan Datu Pengiran Mohamad, Mukah
- Sekolah Kebangsaan Datuk Awang Udin, Mukah
- Sekolah Kebangsaan Kampung Balan, Mukah
- Sekolah Kebangsaan Kampung Igan, Mukah
- Sekolah Kebangsaan Kampung Jebungan, Mukah
- Sekolah Kebangsaan Kampung Klid/Plajau, Dalat, Mukah
- Sekolah Kebangsaan Kampung Petanak, Mukah
- Sekolah Kebangsaan Kampung Seberang, Mukah
- Sekolah Kebangsaan Kampung Senau, Mukah
- Sekolah Kebangsaan Kampung Tanam, Mukah
- Sekolah Kebangsaan Kampung Tebaang, Mukah
- Sekolah Kebangsaan Kampung Tellian, Mukah
- Sekolah Kebangsaan Kuala Kenyana, Mukah
- Sekolah Kebangsaan Kuala Matu, Mukah
- Sekolah Kebangsaan Orang Kaya Selair Matu, Mukah
- Sekolah Kebangsaan Mukah
- Sekolah Kebangsaan Nangar, Mukah
- Sekolah Kebangsaan Orang Kaya Muda, Mukah
- Sekolah Kebangsaan Orang Kaya Sergunim, Mukah
- Sekolah Kebangsaan Semop, Mukah
- Sekolah Kebangsaan SLDB No. 1, Mukah
- Sekolah Kebangsaan St. John Kg Medong, Dalat, Mukah
- Sekolah Kebangsaan St. Jude, Mukah
- Sekolah Kebangsaan St. Kevin Sungai Kut, Mukah
- Sekolah Kebangsaan Sungai Kut Tengah, Mukah
- Sekolah Kebangsaan St. Patrick Mukah
- Sekolah Kebangsaan Sungai Nai, Mukah
- Sekolah Kebangsaan Sungai Pinang, Mukah
- Sekolah Kebangsaan Sungai Ud, Mukah

=== Samarahan Division ===
- Sekolah Kebangsaan Abang Kadir Gedong, Samarahan
- Sekolah Kebangsaan Abang Man, Samarahan
- Sekolah Kebangsaan Asajaya Ulu, Samarahan
- Sekolah Kebangsaan Balai Ringin, Samarahan
- Sekolah Kebangsaan Dato Mohd Musa, Samarahan
- Sekolah Kebangsaan Dato Traoh Muara Tuang, Samarahan
- Sekolah Kebangsaan Endap, Samarahan
- Sekolah Kebangsaan Engkaroh, Samarahan
- Sekolah Kebangsaan Entayan, Samarahan
- Sekolah Kebangsaan Gahat Mawang, Samarahan
- Sekolah Kebangsaan Gemang, Samarahan
- Sekolah Kebangsaan Haji Kelali Semera, Samarahan
- Sekolah Kebangsaan Iboi / Pelanduk, Samarahan
- Sekolah Kebangsaan Jalan Muara Tuang, Samarahan
- Sekolah Kebangsaan Jemukan, Samarahan
- Sekolah Kebangsaan Kampung Baru Samarahan
- Sekolah Kebangsaan Krangan, Samarahan
- Sekolah Kebangsaan Lobang Batu, Samarahan
- Sekolah Kebangsaan Lubok Antu Reban, Samarahan
- Sekolah Kebangsaan Melansai, Samarahan
- Sekolah Kebangsaan Mentu Tapu, Samarahan
- Sekolah Kebangsaan Meranek, Samarahan
- Sekolah Kebangsaan Pati, Samarahan
- Sekolah Kebangsaan Pinang, Samarahan
- Sekolah Kebangsaan Plaman Baki / Menaul, Samarahan
- Sekolah Kebangsaan Rebak, Samarahan
- Sekolah Kebangsaan Rituh, Samarahan
- Sekolah Kebangsaan Sambir, Samarahan
- Sekolah Kebangsaan Sampun Tebun, Samarahan
- Sekolah Kebangsaan Serian, Samarahan
- Sekolah Kebangsaan St. John Taee, Samarahan
- Sekolah Kebangsaan St. Jude Bunan, Samarahan
- Sekolah Kebangsaan St. Martin, Samarahan
- Sekolah Kebangsaan St. Michael, Samarahan
- Sekolah Kebangsaan St. Patrick Tangga, Samarahan
- Sekolah Kebangsaan St. Raymond Mujat, Samarahan
- Sekolah Kebangsaan St. Teresa Serian, Samarahan
- Sekolah Kebangsaan Sungai Rimu, Samarahan
- Sekolah Kebangsaan Tambirat, Samarahan
- Sekolah Kebangsaan Tanjong Apong, Samarahan
- Sekolah Kebangsaan Tarat, Samarahan
- Sekolah Kebangsaan Tebedu, Samarahan
- Sekolah Kebangsaan Tebelu, Samarahan
- Sekolah Kebangsaan Tegelam, Samarahan
- Sekolah Kebangsaan Wira Jaya, Samarahan
- Sekolah Kebangsaan Pangkalan Kuap, Samarahan

=== Sarikei Division ===
- Sekolah Kebangsaan Abang Amin, Sarikei
- Sekolah Kebangsaan Abang Haji Matahir, Sarikei
- Sekolah Kebangsaan Bandar Bintangor, Sarikei
- Sekolah Kebangsaan Methodist Anglo-Chinese, Sarikei
- Sekolah Kebangsaan Nanga Kara, Sarikei
- Sekolah Kebangsaan Nanga Pakan, Sarikei
- Sekolah Kebangsaan Nanga Sengaih, Sarikei
- Sekolah Kebangsaan Rentap, Sarikei
- Sekolah Kebangsaan St. Alphonsus, Sarikei
- Sekolah Kebangsaan St. Anne, Sarikei
- Sekolah Kebangsaan St. Augustine Meradong, Sarikei
- Sekolah Kebangsaan Sungai Kawi, Sarikei
- Sekolah Kebangsaan Sungai Mador, Sarikei
- Sekolah kebangsaan Sarikei, Sarikei
- Sekolah Kebangsaan Sungai Paoh, Sarikei
- Sekolah Kebangsaan Adin, Sarikei

=== Sibu Division ===
- Sekolah Kebangsaan Abang Ali, Sibu
- Sekolah Kebangsaan Batu 10 Jalan Oya, Sibu
- Sekolah Kebangsaan Batu 15, Sibu
- Sekolah Kebangsaan Dijih, Selangau, Sibu
- Sekolah Kebangsaan Hua Hin English, Sibu
- Sekolah Kebangsaan Kampung Bahagia Jaya, Sibu
- Sekolah Kebangsaan Methodist Sibu
- Sekolah Kebangsaan Nanga Dap, Sibu
- Sekolah Kebangsaan Nanga Machan, Sibu
- Sekolah Kebangsaan Nanga Tada, Sibu
- Sekolah Kebangsaan Penghulu Imban, Sekuau, Sibu
- Sekolah Kebangsaan Perbandaran Sibu No. 4, Sibu
- Sekolah Kebangsaan Sacred Heart Sibu
- Sekolah Kebangsaan Sedc, Sibu
- Sekolah Kebangsaan Sentosa Sibu
- Sekolah Kebangsaan Sibu Bandaran No. 2
- Sekolah Kebangsaan Sibu Bandaran No. 3
- Sekolah Kebangsaan Sibu Jaya, Sibu
- Sekolah Kebangsaan St. Mary Sibu
- Sekolah Kebangsaan St. Rita Sibu
- Sekolah Kebangsaan Sungai Anak, Selangau, Sibu
- Sekolah Kebangsaan Sungai Naman, Sibu
- Sekolah Kebangsaan Sungai Sepiring / Sungai Tepus, Sibu
- Sekolah Kebangsaan Ulu Ranan, Sibu
- Sekolah Kebangsaan Ulu Sungai Merah
- Sekolah Kebangsaan Bandaran Sibu No. 4, Sibu

=== Sri Aman Division ===
- Sekolah Kebangsaan Abang Aing, Sri Aman
- Sekolah Kebangsaan Batang Ai, Sri Aman
- Sekolah Kebangsaan Engkilili No. 1, Sri Aman
- Sekolah Kebangsaan Engkranji, Sri Aman
- Sekolah Kebangsaan Kem Pakit, Sri Aman
- Sekolah Kebangsaan Kem Skrang, Sri Aman
- Sekolah Kebangsaan Keranggas, Sri Aman
- Sekolah Kebangsaan Lubok Antu, Sri Aman
- Sekolah Kebangsaan Melugu, Sri Aman
- Sekolah Kebangsaan Pantu, Sri Aman
- Sekolah Kebangsaan Selepong, Sri Aman
- Sekolah Kebangsaan Sri Aman
- Sekolah Kebangsaan St. Luke Sri Aman
- Sekolah Kebangsaan Tanjung Bijat, Sri Aman
- Sekolah Kebangsaan Temudok Kem, Sri Aman

== National-type (Chinese) secondary schools ==
List of national-type (Chinese) secondary schools in Sarawak
Name	Name in Chinese	Name in Malay	Location
Chung Cheng National Type (Chinese) Secondary School	中正国民型华文中学	Sekolah Menengah Jenis Kebangsaan (Cina) Chung Cheng	Sibu
Chung Hua National Type (Chinese) Secondary School	美里中华国民型华文中学	Sekolah Menengah Jenis Kebangsaan (Cina) Chung Hua	Miri
Chung Hua National Type (Chinese) Secondary School	中华国民型华文中学	Sekolah Menengah Jenis Kebangsaan (Cina) Chung Hua	Sibu
Kai Chung National Type (Chinese) Secondary School	开中国民型华文中学	Sekolah Menengah Jenis Kebangsaan (Cina) Kai Chung	Bintangor
Kwong Hwa National Type (Chinese) Secondary School	光华国民型华文中学	Sekolah Menengah Jenis Kebangsaan (Cina) Kwong Hwa	Sibu
Sarikei National Type (Chinese) Higher Secondary School	泗里街高级国民型华文中学	Sekolah Menengah Tinggi Jenis Kebangsaan (Cina) Sarikei	Sarikei
Tiong Hin National Type (Chinese) Secondary School	中兴国民型华文中学	Sekolah Menengah Jenis Kebangsaan (Cina) Tiong Hin	Sibu
Tong Hua National Type (Chinese) Secondary School	东华国民型华文中学	Sekolah Menengah Jenis Kebangsaan (Cina) Tong Hua	Bintangor
Kuching High School(Chung Hua Middle School No.2)	古晋国民型华文中学(古晋中华第二中学)	Sekolah Menengah Jenis Kebangsaan (Cina) Tinggi Kuching	Kuching
Tung Hua National Type (Chinese) Secondary School	敦化国民型华文中学	Sekolah Menengah Jenis Kebangsaan (Cina) Tung Hua	Sibu

== Islamic religious national secondary schools ==
List of Islamic religious national secondary schools in Sarawak
Name	Native name (Malay)	Location	URL
Igan Religious National Secondary School	Sekolah Menengah Kebangsaan Agama Igan	Mukah	
Limbang Religious National Secondary School	Sekolah Menengah Kebangsaan Agama Limbang	Limbang	
Matang Religious National Secondary School	Sekolah Menengah Kebangsaan Agama Matang	Kuching	
Miri Religious National Secondary School	Sekolah Menengah Kebangsaan Agama Miri	Miri	
Sheikh Haji Othman Abdul Wahab Religious National Secondary School	Sekolah Menengah Kebangsaan Agama Sheikh Haji Othman Abdul Wahab	Kuching	
Sibu Religious National Secondary School	Sekolah Menengah Kebangsaan Agama Sibu	Sibu	
Tun Ahmad Zaidi Religious National Secondary School	Sekolah Menengah Kebangsaan Agama Tun Ahmad Zaidi	Kuching	

== National Secondary Schools ==
School code	School name	Postcode	Area	Coordinates
YEB1303	Kolej D Patinggi Abang Hj Abdillah	93050	Kuching	1.5786°N 110.3541°E
YEB4101	Kolej Tun Datu Tuanku Hj Bujang	98009	Miri	4.3593°N 113.9644°E
YEA2201	SMK (BM) Saratok	95407	Saratok	1.7636°N 111.3378°E
YEA8101	SMK Asajaya	94600	Asajaya	1.5674°N 110.6100°E
YEA8103	SMK Asajaya No. 2	94600	Asajaya	1.5448°N 110.5232°E
YEA9104	SMK Asyakirin	97000	Bintulu	3.2680°N 113.1136°E
YEA1205	SMK Bako	93050	Kuching	1.6449°N 110.4475°E
YEE4301	SMK Bakong	98008	Miri	3.9763°N 114.0942°E
YEA7102	SMK Bakun	96900	Belaga	3.0455°N 113.9173°E
YEB8204	SMK Balai Ringin	94700	Serian	1.0498°N 110.7503°E
YEA7101	SMK Balleh	96807	Kapit	1.8948°N 113.4314°E
YEA6301	SMK Bandar Bintangor	96500	Bintangor	2.1657°N 111.6344°E
YEA9101	SMK Bandar Bintulu	97008	Bintulu	3.1955°N 113.0799°E
YEB1202	SMK Bandar Kuching No. 1	93300	Kuching	1.5408°N 110.3597°E
YEA1209	SMK Bandar Samariang	93050	Kuching	1.6325°N 110.3284°E
YEB6101	SMK Bandar Sarikei	96107	Sarikei	2.1007°N 111.5258°E
YEA3106	SMK Bandar Sibu	96000	Sibu	2.3236°N 111.8526°E
YEB4303	SMK Bario	98050	Marudi	3.7300°N 115.4800°E
YEA4102	SMK Baru	98000	Miri	4.3767°N 113.9978°E
YEA9102	SMK Baru Bintulu	97010	Bintulu	3.1662°N 113.0600°E
YEA3202	SMK Batang Igan	96300	Dalat	2.6099°N 111.8270°E
YEA1304	SMK Batu Kawa	93250	Kuching	1.5190°N 110.2917°E
YEE1204	SMK Batu Lintang	93200	Kuching	1.5324°N 110.3480°E
YEE1101	SMK Bau	94000	Bau	1.4287°N 110.1545°E
YEA3201	SMK Bawang Assan	96000	Sibu	2.3002°N 111.6853°E
YEA4402	SMK Bekenu	98150	Bekenu	4.0604°N 113.8118°E
YEA2404	SMK Beladin	95700	Betong	1.6323°N 111.1995°E
YEE7201	SMK Belaga	96900	Belaga	2.7012°N 113.7774°E
YEA6101	SMK Belawai	96150	Belawai	2.2000°N 111.2300°E
YEE9103	SMK Bintulu	97007	Bintulu	3.1936°N 113.0572°E
YEA3107	SMK Bukit Assek	96000	Sibu	2.2748°N 111.8742°E
YEA3101	SMK Bukit Lima	96000	Sibu	2.2699°N 111.8547°E
YFB3201	SMJK Chung Cheng	96008	Sibu	2.2445°N 111.7728°E
YFB3106	SMJK Chung Hua	96000	Sibu	2.2712°N 111.8449°E
YFB4101	SMJK Chung Hua	98007	Miri	4.3782°N 113.9777°E
YEA1201	SMK D P H Abdul Gapor	93350	Kuching	1.5173°N 110.3514°E
YEE3501	SMK Dalat	96300	Dalat	2.7440°N 111.9406°E
YEA4101	SMK Dato Permaisuri	98000	Miri	4.4254°N 114.0136°E
YEB3301	SMK Datuk Haji Abdul Rahman Yakub	96700	Kanowit	2.1000°N 112.1663°E
YEE2402	SMK Datuk Patinggi Kedit	95700	Betong	1.3708°N 111.5709°E
YEA1207	SMK Demak Baru	93050	Kuching	1.5865°N 110.3692°E
YEA3102	SMK Deshon	96000	Sibu	2.3079°N 111.8498°E
YEE3201	SMK Durin	96007	Sibu	2.1209°N 111.9783°E
YEE2301	SMK Engkilili	95800	Engkilili	1.1353°N 111.6407°E
YEA8302	SMK Gedong	94700	Serian	1.2148°N 110.6887°E
YEB1201	SMK Green Road	93150	Kuching	1.5443°N 110.3346°E
YEA1206	SMK Jalan Arang	93250	Kuching	1.5033°N 110.3279°E
YEE3202	SMK Jalan Oya	96000	Sibu	2.3358°N 111.9544°E
YEB6201	SMK Julau	96600	Julau	2.0301°N 111.9071°E
YEA6202	SMK Julau No. 2	96600	Julau	2.0492°N 111.9055°E
YEA2202	SMK Kabong	94650	Kabong	1.8062°N 111.1235°E
YFB6301	SMJK Kai Chung	96507	Bintangor	2.1700°N 111.6400°E
YEE2202	SMK Kalaka	95300	Roban	1.8528°N 111.3189°E
YEE3102	SMK Kampung Nangka	96000	Sibu	2.3181°N 111.8352°E
YEA3302	SMK Kanowit	96700	Kanowit	2.0982°N 112.1451°E
YEE7101	SMK Kapit	96807	Kapit	2.0147°N 112.9446°E
YEA7103	SMK Kapit No. 2	96800	Kapit	2.0072°N 112.9259°E
YEA7301	SMK Katibas	96850	Song	1.9063°N 112.5581°E
YEA9105	SMK Kemena	97000	Bintulu	3.1416°N 113.0521°E
YEA9103	SMK Kidurong	97011	Bintulu	3.2350°N 113.0788°E
YEA8102	SMK Kota Samarahan	94300	Kota Samarahan	1.3801°N 110.4438°E
YEA5102	SMK Kubong	98700	Limbang	4.7270°N 114.9814°E
YFB3203	SMJK Kwong Hua Middle	96008	Sibu	2.2444°N 111.8032°E
YEB1102	SMK Lake	94000	Bau	1.4082°N 110.1387°E
YEA3104	SMK Lanang	96000	Sibu	2.2512°N 111.8557°E
YEE5201	SMK Lawas	98850	Lawas	4.8568°N 115.3952°E
YEE5101	SMK Limbang	98700	Limbang	4.7511°N 115.0187°E
YEA2102	SMK Lingga	95000	Sri Aman	1.2615°N 111.4149°E
YEB4302	SMK Long Lama	98300	Long Lama	3.7667°N 114.4000°E
YEA4106	SMK Lopeng Tengah	98000	Miri	4.3631°N 113.9888°E
YEA4103	SMK Luak	98000	Miri	4.3461°N 113.9798°E
YEE4401	SMK Luar Bandar Miri	98009	Miri	4.0860°N 113.9595°E
YEB3201	SMK Luar Bandar No 1	96007	Sibu	2.3043°N 112.0638°E
YEB2301	SMK Lubok Antu	95900	Lubok Antu	1.0383°N 111.8369°E
YEE1401	SMK Lundu	94500	Lundu	1.6889°N 109.8510°E
YEE4101	SMK Lutong	98100	Miri	4.4612°N 114.0028°E
YEB4301	SMK Marudi	98050	Baram	4.1821°N 114.3347°E
YEA1307	SMK Matang Hilir	93050	Kuching	1.5753°N 110.2739°E
YEA1208	SMK Matang Jaya	93050	Kuching	1.5819°N 110.3072°E
YEE6401	SMK Matu	96200	Daro	2.6692°N 111.5403°E
YEB5101	SMK Medamit	98708	Limbang	4.4802°N 114.9227°E
YEE2102	SMK Melugu	95008	Sri Aman	1.1189°N 111.4244°E
YEE6301	SMK Meradong	96509	Bintangor	2.0730°N 111.6756°E
YEA5202	SMK Merapok	98850	Lawas	4.9386°N 115.5022°E
YEA4107	SMK Merbau	98100	Miri	4.4550°N 114.0488°E
YFB3101	SMK Methodist	96000	Sibu	2.2951°N 111.8265°E
YEE8101	SMK Muara Tuang	94300	Kota Samarahan	1.4483°N 110.3995°E
YEA3402	SMK Mukah	96400	Mukah	2.8895°N 112.0797°E
YEA3303	SMK Nanga Dap	96700	Kanowit	2.0521°N 112.3180°E
YEA3501	SMK Oya	96300	Dalat	2.8929°N 112.0879°E
YEA1306	SMK Padawan	93250	Kuching	1.2195°N 110.3718°E
YEE1205	SMK Padungan	93450	Kuching	1.5478°N 110.3622°E
YEA6201	SMK Pakan	96510	Pakan	1.8878°N 111.6833°E
YEA1101	SMK Paku (S)	94000	Bau	1.4275°N 110.1945°E
YEE1201	SMK Pending	93450	Kuching	1.5478°N 110.3831°E
YEE1303	SMK Penrissen	93250	Kuching	1.3959°N 110.3386°E
YEA1301	SMK Petra Jaya	93050	Kuching	1.5650°N 110.3189°E
YEA4109	SMK Pujut	98100	Miri	4.4862°N 114.0134°E
YEA2401	SMK Pusa	94950	Pusa	1.6297°N 111.2924°E
YEA4105	SMK Riam	98000	Miri	4.3167°N 113.9964°E
YEE3101	SMK Rosli Dhoby	96000	Sibu	2.3133°N 111.8566°E
YFB3102	SMK Sacred Heart	96000	Sibu	2.2964°N 111.8417°E
YEA8303	SMK Sadong Hilir (Semera)	94600	Asajaya	1.5495°N 110.6769°E
YEA8401	SMK Sadong Jaya	94600	Sadong	1.4700°N 110.7000°E
YEA1305	SMK Santubong	93050	Kuching	1.6513°N 110.3346°E
YEE2201	SMK Saratok	95407	Saratok	1.7636°N 111.3378°E
YEE2401	SMK Saribas	95500	Debak	1.5600°N 111.4200°E
YEA6102	SMK Sarikei Baru	96100	Sarikei	2.1297°N 111.5049°E
YEB9102	SMK Sebauh	97100	Sebauh	3.1114°N 113.2721°E
YEA8304	SMK Sebuyau	94850	Sebuyau	1.5136°N 110.9285°E
YEE7102	SMK Selirik	96807	Kapit	2.0000°N 112.9787°E
YEA1401	SMK Sematan	94500	Sematan	1.8028°N 109.7630°E
YEA1309	SMK Semerah Padi	93050	Kuching	1.5807°N 110.3191°E
YEAB301	SMK Semop	96200	Daro	2.4139°N 111.3986°E
YEA1402	SMK Senibong	94500	Lundu	1.5983°N 109.8947°E
YEA5101	SMK Seri Patiambun Limbang	98707	Limbang	4.7908°N 115.0041°E
YEA1202	SMK Seri Setia	93350	Kuching	1.5362°N 110.3918°E
YEB8205	SMK Serian	94700	Serian	1.1700°N 110.5700°E
YEA1203	SMK Sg Maong	93150	Kuching	1.5470°N 110.3168°E
YEE6101	SMK Sg Paoh	96107	Sarikei	2.0216°N 111.4674°E
YEB8101	SMK Sg Tapang	93250	Kuching	1.4612°N 110.3304°E
YEA3103	SMK Sibu Jaya	96000	Sibu	2.2440°N 111.9600°E
YEE1302	SMK Siburan	94200	Kuching	1.3669°N 110.3981°E
YEE2101	SMK Simanggang	95008	Sri Aman	1.2409°N 111.4533°E
YEE8304	SMK Simunjan No 1	94800	Simunjan	1.3585°N 110.7982°E
YEA1102	SMK Singai	94000	Bau	1.4753°N 110.1512°E
YEE7301	SMK Song	96850	Song	2.0059°N 112.5562°E
YEA7302	SMK Song No. 2	96850	Song	2.0050°N 112.5448°E
YEA2402	SMK Spaoh	95600	Spaoh	1.4615°N 111.4832°E
YEA2101	SMK Sri Aman	95007	Sri Aman	1.2080°N 111.4747°E
YEA1310	SMK Sri Matang	93050	Kuching	1.5815°N 110.2343°E
YEA8301	SMK Sri Sadong	94800	Simunjan	1.3800°N 110.7800°E
YFB6102	SMK St Anthony	96100	Sarikei	2.1273°N 111.5203°E
YFB3103	SMK St Elizabeth	96000	Sibu	2.2976°N 111.8453°E
YFB1202	SMK St Joseph	93000	Kuching	1.5515°N 110.3411°E
YFB2101	SMK St Luke	95000	Sri Aman	1.2271°N 111.4689°E
YFB1205	SMK St Mary	93000	Kuching	1.5557°N 110.3469°E
YFB1203	SMK St Teresa	93000	Kuching	1.5511°N 110.3426°E
YFB1204	SMK St Thomas	93000	Kuching	1.5548°N 110.3453°E
YFB2401	SMK St. Augustine	95700	Betong	1.4052°N 111.5256°E
YFB4102	SMK St. Columba	98007	Miri	4.3846°N 113.9841°E
YFB4103	SMK St. Joseph	98007	Miri	4.3746°N 113.9734°E
YFB3401	SMK St. Patrick	96400	Mukah	2.9012°N 112.0895°E
YEA4401	SMK Suai	98200	Niah	3.8616°N 113.7124°E
YEB4401	SMK Subis	98200	Batu Niah	4.0822°N 113.9432°E
YEA5201	SMK Sundar	98800	Lawas	4.8881°N 115.2104°E
YEA3105	SMK Sungai Merah	96000	Sibu	2.2883°N 111.8312°E
YEA1204	SMK Tabuan Jaya	93350	Kuching	1.5134°N 110.3851°E
YEA8201	SMK Taee	94700	Serian	1.1912°N 110.4665°E
YEA4108	SMK Taman Tunku	98000	Miri	4.3039°N 113.9910°E
YEB8203	SMK Tarat	94700	Serian	1.2069°N 110.5350°E
YEA9201	SMK Tatau	97200	Tatau	2.8857°N 112.8569°E
YEB8202	SMK Tebakang	94750	Serian	1.0992°N 110.5056°E
YEA8202	SMK Tebedu	94700	Serian	1.0125°N 110.3947°E
YEA4305	SMK Telang Usan	98050	Baram	4.1916°N 114.3433°E
YEA4301	SMK Temenggong Datuk Lawai Jau	98009	Miri	3.2992°N 114.7819°E
YEE3401	SMK Three Rivers	96400	Mukah	2.9020°N 112.0792°E
YFB1201	SMJK Tinggi Kuching	93100	Kuching	1.5545°N 110.3494°E
YFB6101	SMJK Tinggi Sarikei	96107	Sarikei	2.0891°N 111.5260°E
YEA4306	SMK Tinjar	98050	Baram	3.7063°N 114.1879°E
YFB3104	SMJK Tiong Hin	96000	Sibu	2.3289°N 111.8387°E
YEE6402	SMK Toh Puan Datuk Patinggi Hjh Normah	96200	Daro	2.5200°N 111.4200°E
YFB6302	SMJK Tong Hua	96500	Bintangor	2.1542°N 111.7381°E
YEB5202	SMK Trusan	98850	Lawas	4.7940°N 115.2764°E
YEE1301	SMK Tun Abang Hj Openg	93050	Kuching	1.5719°N 110.3626°E
YEB1301	SMK Tun Abdul Razak	94200	Kuching	1.2777°N 110.4215°E
YFB3105	SMJK Tung Hua	96007	Sibu	2.3097°N 111.8303°E
YEA1303	SMK Tunku Abdul Rahman	93050	Kuching	1.5615°N 110.3171°E
YEA4304	SMK Tutoh Apoh	98050	Baram	3.9500°N 114.5400°E
YEA3401	SMK Ulu Balingian	96000	Sibu	2.5720°N 112.5491°E
YEA2403	SMK Ulu Layar	95700	Betong	1.4819°N 111.5761°E
YEA1302	SMK Wira Penrissen	94300	Kota Samarahan	1.4446°N 110.3260°E

== Sekolah Berasrama Penuh ==
- Sekolah Menengah Sains Kuching
- Sekolah Menengah Sains Miri
- Sekolah Menengah Sains Kuching Utara
- Sekolah Seni Malaysia Sarawak

== Technical National High Schools ==
- Sekolah Menengah Teknik Betong
- Sekolah Menengah Teknik Bintulu
- Sekolah Menengah Teknik Kuching
- Sekolah Menengah Teknik Matang
- Sekolah Menengah Teknik Miri
- Sekolah Menengah Teknik Sejingkat
- Sekolah Menengah Teknik Sibu

== International Schools ==
- Bintulu International School, Bintulu
- Borneo International School, Kuching
- Lodge International School, Kuching
- Kidurong International School, Bintulu
- Tunku Putra School, Kuching
- Tenby International School, Miri
- Woodlands International School, Sibu
- St Joseph International School, Kuching

== Private Schools (Primary) ==
- Sekolah Rendah Lodge (Lodge National Primary School), Kuching
- Sekolah Rendah Sri Tenby, Miri
- Sekolah Rendah Sri Mawar, Miri
- Sekolah Rendah Sri Mulia, Miri
- St Joseph's Private Primary School, Kuching
- Sunny Hill Primary School, Kuching
- Sekolah Rendah Ma'had Tahfiz Tun Abdul-Rahman Ya'kub (MATTARY), Kuching
- Sekolah Rendah Ayer Manis, Serian

== Private Schools (Secondary) ==
- Sekolah Menengah Lodge (Lodge National Secondary School), Kuching
- Sekolah Menengah Tunku Putra (Tunku Putra Secondary School), Kuching
- Sekolah Menengah Swasta Sunny Hill, Kuching
- St. Joseph's Private Secondary School, Kuching
- Sekolah Menengah Swasta Mizuhashi, Miri (will be launched)

== Kindergartens ==
- Tadika Miri Chinese
- Tadika Sri Mawar, Miri
- Tadika Inspirasi Ceria, Miri.
- Petronita Kindergarten, Kidurong, Bintulu (for Petronas staffs' children only)
- An-Nur Kindergarten, Kidurong, Bintulu
- Tadika Astana, Miri.
- Tadika St Edmund, Limbang
- Tadika Lodge (Lodge Kindergarten), Kuching
- Chin Chin Daycare centre and playgroup, Kuching, Sarawak

== College Schools ==
- Kolej Datu Patinggi Abang Haji Abdillah, Kuching
- Kolej Tun Datu Tuanku Haji Bujang, Miri
- Sunny Hills, Kuching

== Maktab Rendah Sains Mara ==
- Maktab Rendah Sains Mara, Betong
- Maktab Rendah Sains Mara, Mukah
- Maktab Rendah Sains Mara, Kuching
