= Grigat =

Gerigat
- Location within Borneo
- Coordinates: 2.03333°N 111.2°E
- Country: Malaysia
- State: Sarawak
- Elevation: 1 m (3.3 ft)

Gerigat (also known as Grigat) is a settlement in Kabong District, Betong Division, Sarawak, Malaysia. It lies approximately 108.6 kilometres (67.5 mi) east-north-east of the state capital Kuching. Neighbouring settlements include:

- Kampung Muara Selalang 5.6 kilometres (3.5 mi) north
- Kampung Peruntong 9.3 kilometres (5.8 mi) south
- Nyabor 9.3 kilometres (5.8 mi) south
