= SMKC =

SMKC may refer to:

- Slash featuring Myles Kennedy and the Conspirators
- Kai Chung Secondary School (Malay: Sekolah Menengah Kai Chung), in Sarawak, Malaysia
- Sekolah Menengah Kebangsaan Cyberjaya, a school in Selangor, Malaysia
