= Kampung Alit =

- Location within Borneo
- Coordinates: 1.93333°N 111.16667°E
- Country: Malaysia
- State: Sarawak
- Administrative Division: Saratok
- Elevation: 1 m (3.3 ft)

Kampung Alit is a settlement in the Saratok division of Sarawak, Malaysia. It lies approximately 100.6 kilometres (63 mi) east-north-east of the state capital Kuching.

Neighbouring settlements include:

- Kampung Nyabor 2.6 kilometres (1.6 mi) southeast
- Rumah Nyaing 2.6 kilometres (1.6 mi) southeast
- Rumah Langga 3.7 kilometres (2.3 mi) east
- Rumah Kasi 3.7 kilometres (2.3 mi) east
- Rumah Engkilo Dana 4.1 kilometres (2.5 mi) southeast
- Nyabor 4.1 kilometres (2.5 mi) northeast
- Kampung Peruntong 4.1 kilometres (2.5 mi) northeast
- Rumah Jamin 4.1 kilometres (2.5 mi) southwest
- Rumah Ladi 5.6 kilometres (3.5 mi) east
- Rumah Bair 5.9 kilometres (3.7 mi) east
