= Sacred Heart National Secondary School =

Secondary school in Sibu

Sacred Heart Secondary School
- 圣心中学; Sekolah Menengah Kebangsaan Sacred Heart
- Coat of arms

Location
- Jalan Brother Albinus, 96000; Sibu, Sarawak; Malaysia; 2.2966°N 111.8423°E

Information
- Type: Missionary secondary school
- Motto: Prayer and Labour; Latin: Ora et Labora; Malay: Berdoa serta berusaha
- Religious affiliation: Christian
- Denomination: Roman Catholic Church (Sacred Heart Cathedral, Sibu)
- Established: 27 December 1902; 120 years ago
- Founder: Father Aloysius Hopfgartner
- Sister school: SMK St. Elizabeth
- Session: One
- School code: YFB3102
- Principal: David Teo Wu
- Senior Assistants: Ling Ngie Ming (Administration); Dew Ka Yee (Student Affair); Lau Tiew Kiong (Co-curricular); Lai May Ging (Form 6 Affair)
- Gender: Boys (Transition to Form 5); Co-ed (Form 6)
- Enrollment: 1108 (2025)
- Language: Malay; English; Chinese
- Song: School Rally
- Feeder schools: SK Sacred Heart English; SJK (C) Sacred Heart Chinese; SK St. Mary; SK Hua Hin English
- Affiliation: Ministry of Education (Malaysia); Diocese of Sibu
- Website: shssibu.com

Sacred Heart Secondary School (Malay: Sekolah Menengah Kebangsaan Sacred Heart; Chinese: 圣心中学), commonly known as SMK Sacred Heart or Sacred Heart Schools (SHS), is a missionary secondary school in Sibu, Sarawak, in East Malaysia. Founded in 1902, it is the oldest school in the town.

== History ==
=== The school under Catholic Mission (1902-1953) ===
In 1902, the school was founded by Father A. Hopfgartner, who was born on 5 January 1874, and later suffered a stroke and died on 15 May 1949. A clock tower and bronze plaque were erected in his memory on the school premises. By 1905, the school was moved a two storied building at Lanang Road. The lower floor was used as classrooms, with the upper floor used as hostels. The school was then transferred to Mission Road in 1907. The following year Father Hopfgarther was replaced by Father Vincent Halder, the longest serving principal of the school. In 1928, Standard Four (now Primary Six) was introduced followed by the introduction of Standard Five (now Form One) in the succeeding year. The school has classes up to Standard Seven (now Form Three) and the number of pupils had reached 300. In Father Halder's final year as Principal, the Chinese language was added to the school curriculum and the Chinese department was established. After his death, Father Halder was succeeded by Rev. John Vos, who was succeeded by Rev. James Buis in 1938.

==== Japanese Occupation during World War II ====
From 1941 to 1946, the school was put to a half due to the Japanese Occupation during the World War II. Half of the School was destroyed in the bomb raid of the Australian Forces.

==== Post World War II ====
The school was resumed in 1947, with Rev. Fr. John Dekker took over as Principal and the founding of SRB Sacred Heart Chinese. By 1948, the enrollment for the school had increased to 600 students. The school was divided into two parts, the English medium and the Chinese medium. In 1953, the girls were separated from the boys and were moved to another school which was built for them (St. Elizabeth Secondary School).

=== The school under de La Salle Brothers (1954-1987) ===
The de La Salle Brothers took control of the school by 1954, with Bro. Fridolin became the principal. The First Cambridge School Certificate was held (now Form Five). English was taught in the morning and Chinese was taught in the afternoon. The school became an aided school in 1956. SRB Sacred Heart, a primary school, was founded and Bro. Austin became its first Headmaster. Assembly Hall, Science Labs and Workshops were built in the following years. Marist Brothers took control of the Chinese stream school by 1960. Chinese Junior Section has become a part of the school and Malay Language was introduced. First Cambridge Higher School Certificate was opened. The school was moved to Oya Road in 1967. Lower 6 classes were introduced after Bro. Albinus took over as the principal. The school was renovated and a new library, canteen, Administration Block and Science Labs were built.

=== The school under home-grown administrators (1987-present) ===
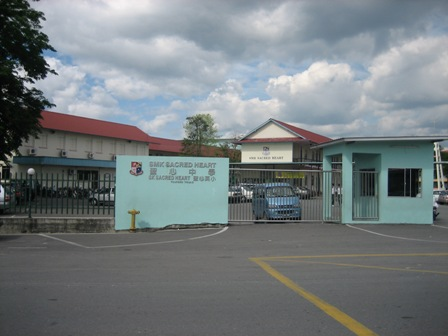
Front gate of the school

In 1987, Mr. Samuel Tan Yang Pheng became the first Malaysian principal of the school, marking an end of the de La Salle Brothers' administration. A new administrative building was built, and a single-storied building was constructed for Form 6 classes in 1998.

== See also ==
- Education in Malaysia
- List of schools in Sarawak
- Secondary school
