= SMK Taman Tunku =

Information
- School type: Secondary school
- Established: January 5, 2004; 22 years ago

Sekolah Menengah Kebangsaan Taman Tunku (SMK Taman Tunku) is a government-run secondary school located in Miri, Sarawak, Malaysia. It was built in July 2001 and completed on 4 September 2003. The school began its operation on 5 January 2004.
