= Kai Chung Secondary School =

Coordinates: 2.1672°N 111.6384°E

- Sekolah Menengah Jenis Kebangsaan Kai Chung 开中国民型华文中学
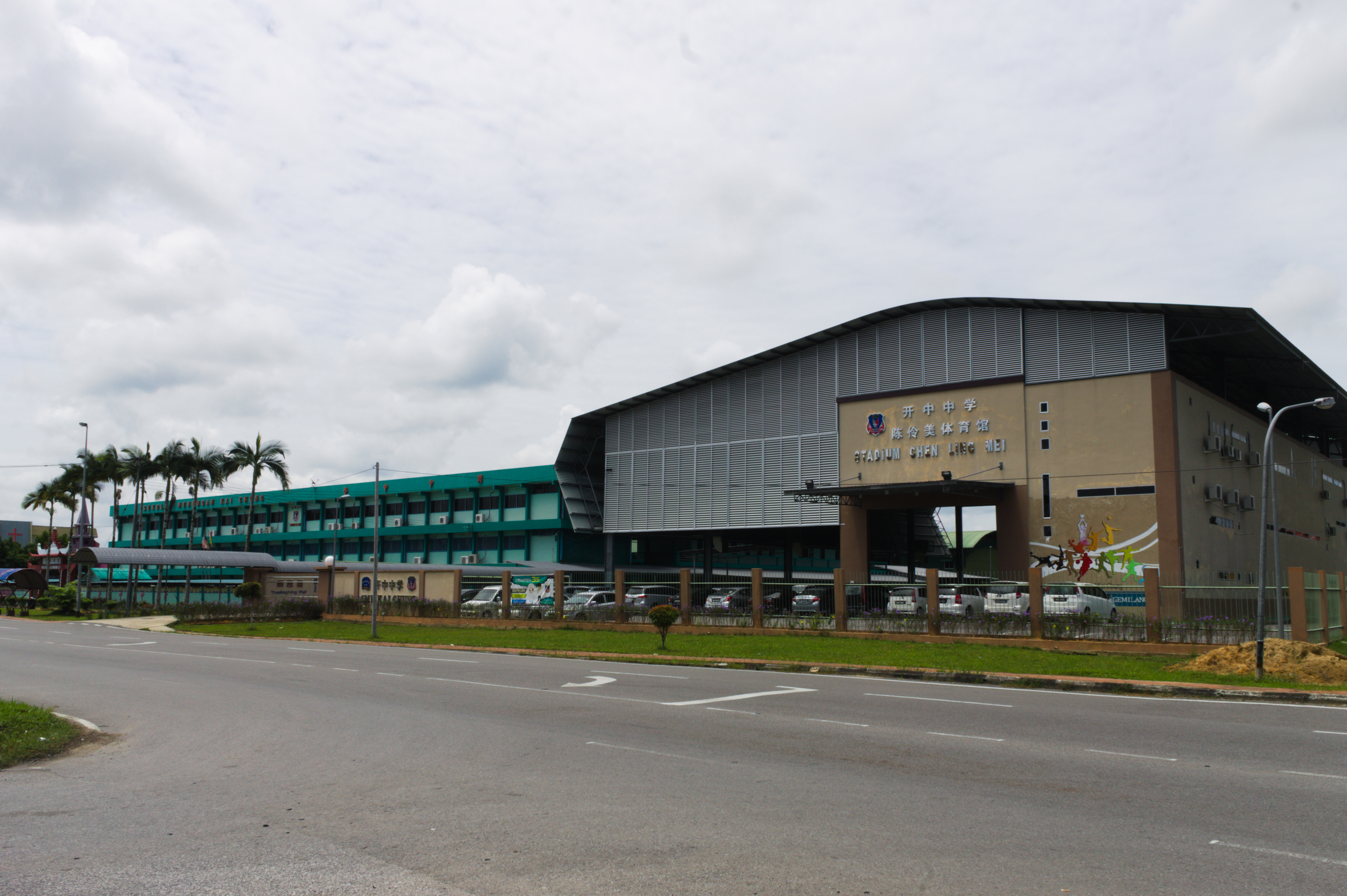
- Kai Chung secondary school academic block and stadium
- Bintangor, Sarawak; Malaysia

Information
- Type: Public Chinese Secondary Co-Ed
- Motto: Courteous, Bravery, Justice, Awareness
- Established: 1922
- School district: Meradong
- Session: Single
- Principal: Mr Paul
- Colours: Yellow, Blue, Red, White
- Yearbook: The Star
- Website: swkaichung.smjk.edu.my

Kai Chung Secondary School (Malay: Sekolah Menengah Kai Chung, abbreviation SMJKKC) is a public secondary school in Bintangor, a town in the East Malaysian state of Sarawak. This school is also a non-fully government school.
