= SJK(C) Chung Hua Batu 4 1/2 =

SJK (C) Chung Hua Batu 4 1/2
- 四哩半中华公学

Location
- Batu 4 1/2, Jalan Datuk Amar Kalong Ningkang; Kuching, Sarawak 93250; Malaysia; 1.5019°N 110.3324°E

Information
- Other name: Sekolah Rendah Bantuan (S.R.B.) Chung Hua Batu 4 1/2
- Former name: Pei Yu Primary School
- School type: Public, primary school
- Motto: 诚礼勤俭 (Honesty, Courtesy, Diligence and Thriftiness)
- Established: July 1st, 1932
- Founder: Zhuo Weinan
- School district: Padawan
- Session: Single
- School number: 082-572632
- School code: YCC1322
- Years taught: Primary 1 - Primary 6
- Age range: 7 to 12
- Average class size: 35
- Language: Chinese
- Hours in school day: 6
- Classrooms: 30
- Colours: Yellow; Black; Red
- Song: 四哩半中公校歌 (SJK(C) Chung Hua 4 1/2 Mile School Song)
- Website: Official school biodata Facebook page

Sekolah Jenis Kebangsaan (Cina) Chung Hua Batu 4 1/2 (Chinese: 四哩半中华公学) is a Chinese national-type primary school situated between Jalan Kong Ping and Jalan Datuk Amar Kalong Ningkang in Kuching, Sarawak, Malaysia.

Built on a 2.6-acre (11,000 m^{2}) site, the school has 30 classrooms, a staffroom, administrative offices, a canteen, library, science labs, computer lab, and a multi-purpose hall which doubles as an assembly area and sports hall for various activities.

== History ==
Originally, the school was named Pei Yu Primary School and was founded by Zhuo Weinan. The school's original location was opened on July 1, 1932 at Jalan Keretapi (now Jalan Tun Ahmad Zaidi Adruce). Then in 1936, the school was moved to its current location at Jalan Penrissen (now a part of Jalan Datuk Amar Kalong Ningkang).

During the Japanese occupation of British Borneo on December 24, 1941, the school was closed and the building was used by the Japanese troops as a hangar to store aircraft wreckage and as a garrison station. By September 11, 1945, the occupation was over, and the school soon resumed classes the following year along with the formation of a proper school council. Soon afterwards, the school was renamed to Sekolah Jenis Kebangsaan (Cina) Chung Hua Batu 4 1/2 as part of a practice to rename all Chinese national-type schools to a proper standard.

By 1995, there were plans to construct a new school building as the existing facilities and classrooms were no longer sufficient. However, an unexpected fire broke out at 3 a.m. on December 4, 1995, which burnt most of the original school building prompting an immediate rebuild of the school. In the meantime, classes were temporarily conducted at SJK(C) Sam Hap Hin at 7th Mile. The rebuilt school was then completed in 1996 and the first classes were conducted on January 4, 1997.

On July 7, 1998, the school became one of the very first of its kind in Kuching to officially incorporate multimedia computer education online courses into its curriculum.

In 2021, the Sarawak Government provided RM2.8 million in funding to support the construction of a newly built four-storey school block with additional classrooms which also includes a covered multi-purpose hall integrated in the middle of the school grounds as well as renovating the entire school to look sleeker and modern as well as allocating an additional 0.6 acres (2,400 m^{2}) of state land in order to extend the school premises for the new block. The following year, the school held an event called the "Fund My School Run 2.0" in order to raise more money for the completion of the construction of the new school block which was steadily progressing at that point.

The new block, designated as Block B, as well as the new multi-purpose school hall was completed and inaugurated on December 1, 2024 with an accompanying school anniversary dinner celebrating the 91st anniversary of the school as a whole.

== Classes ==
Currently, the school has 30 classes in total with over 1000 students. Each class has 5 distinct names based on individual human traits and are colour-coded accordingly. Prior to this however, there were only 24 permanent classes and were solely named after colours in the Malay language.

Classes of SJK (C) Chung Hua 4 1/2
Color	Name	Year 1	Year 2	Year 3	Year 4	Year 5	Year 6
	Leader	1L	2L	3L	4L	5L	6L
	Entrepreneur	1E	2E	3E	4E	5E	6E
	Thinker	1T	2T	3T	4T	5T	6T
	Innovator	1I	2I	3I	4I	5I	6I
	Collaborator	1C	2C	3C	4C	5C	6C

Classes of SJK (C) Chung Hua 4 1/2 (prior)
Color	Name	Year 1	Year 2	Year 3	Year 4	Year 5	Year 6
	Merah	1M	2M	3M	4M	5M	6M
	Biru	1B	2B	3B	4B	5B	6B
	Putih	1P	2P	3P	4P	5P	6P
	Hijau	1H	2H	3H	4H	5H	6H
	Kuning	—			4K	5K	6K

Note: The Kuning (Yellow) class was only meant as an additional class in case there were extra students in a particular year.

== School magazine ==
The school magazine does not have an official name however it is published yearly and still continues to do so. It features academic and cocurricular achievements, essays written by students, class photos, school staff photos, and pictures of various school activities.

== Photos ==
Original (1936-1995)

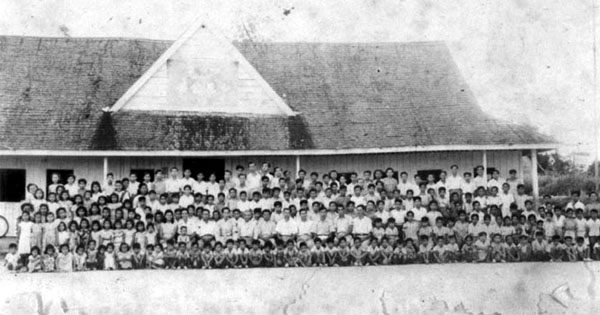
A group photo of the entire school in 1950

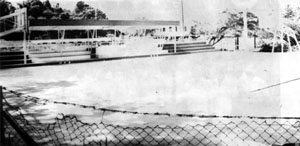
Basketball court as seen in 1940's or 1950's

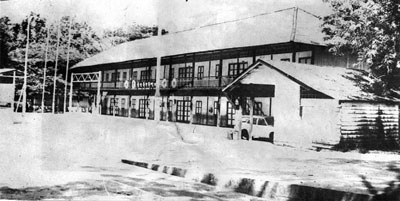
Old front facade of the school in 1957

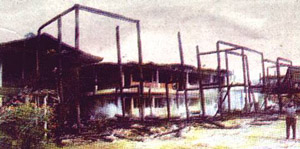
Ruins of the school after the fire
After rebuilding (1996-2024)

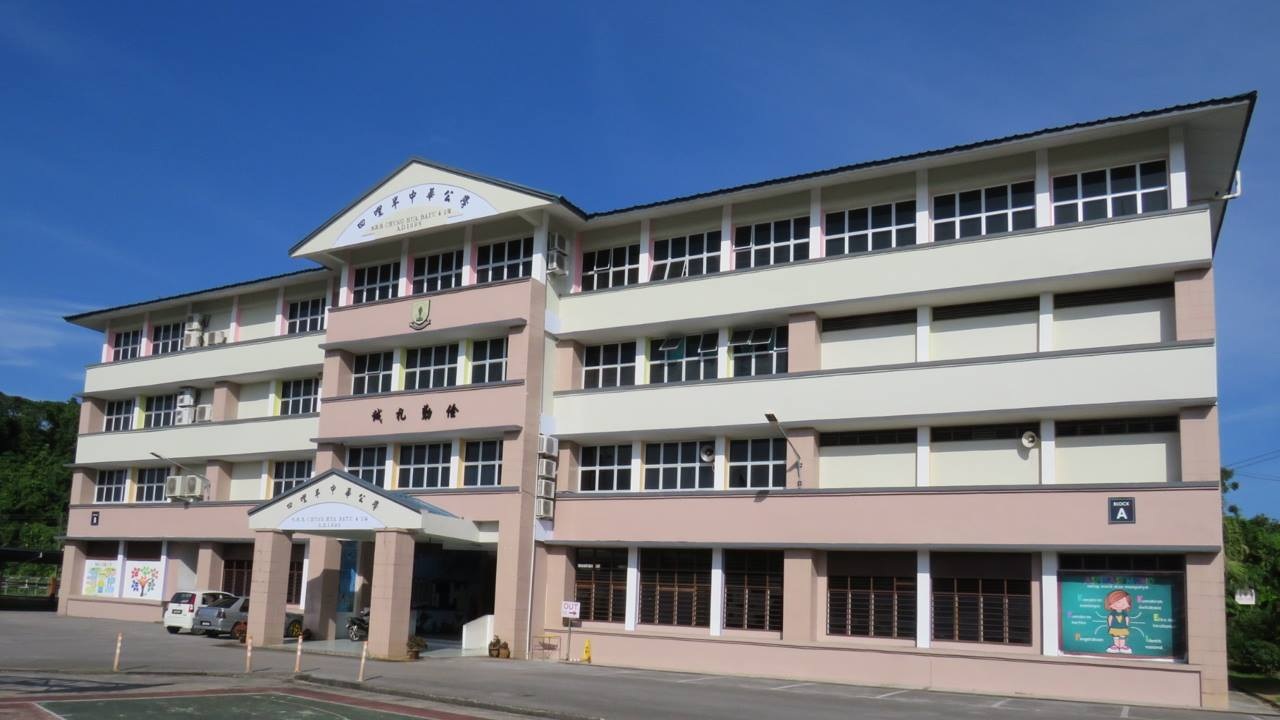
Front facade of the school

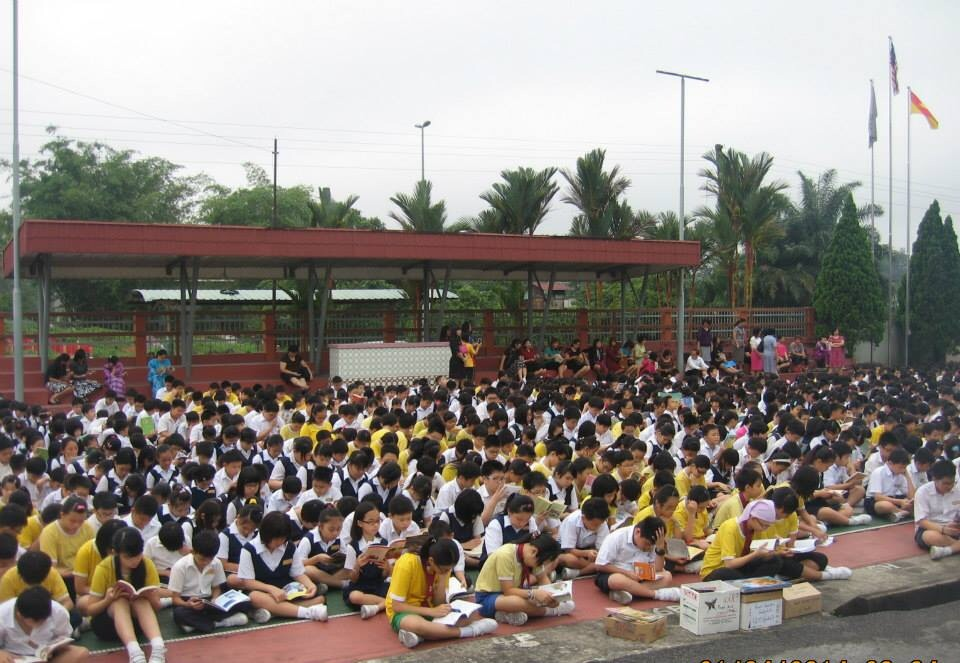
Basketball court and assembly area

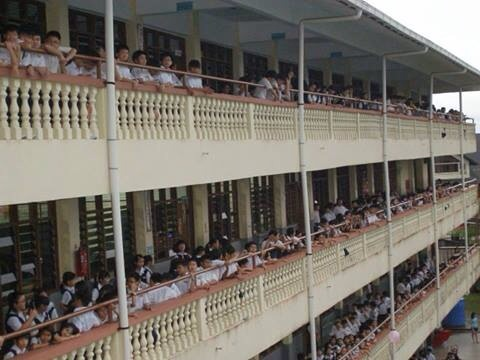
Main classroom block

== See also ==
- Jalan Arang National Secondary School
