= Jalan Arang National Secondary School =

Public secondary school in Kuching, Sarawak, Malaysia

- Sekolah Menengah Kebangsaan Jalan Arang

Location
- Lorong 13, Jalan Arang; Kuching, Sarawak, 93250; Malaysia; 1.5031013°N 110.3280963°E

Information
- School type: public, secondary
- Motto: Berilmu, Berakhlak, Berwawasan (Knowledgeable, Conductive, Insightful)
- Established: 2003
- Founders: Mdm. Belinda Lim Sok Khoon; Mdm. Hii Kwong Ing
- School district: Kuching
- Session: Double
- School number: 082-452871
- School code: YEA1206
- Principal: Dr. Ng Sing Yii
- Grades: Transition – Form 5
- Age: 13 to 18
- Language: Bahasa Malaysia
- Colours: Green; Yellow
- Song: Ku Ukir Namamu
- Yearbook: Semekar
- Website: Official Facebook

Jalan Arang National Secondary School (Malay: Sekolah Menengah Kebangsaan Jalan Arang) is a public secondary school situated on Jalan Arang in Kuching, the capital of the East Malaysian state of Sarawak. The school was founded in January 2003. It offers classes from Transition up to Form 5. In recent times, the principal of the school Madam Wong Nguk Chin has banned students for bringing instant noodles to school as it is deemed unhealthy for the students and discussion regarding this ban will result in scolding by the principal.

Built on a 16-acre (65,000 m^{2}) site, the school has 38 classrooms, a staffroom, administrative offices, a canteen, library, science labs, computer labs, basketball courts, a futsal court, a greenhouse, a football field and an assembly hall.

== History ==
Jalan Arang National Secondary School had its beginnings in 2003, pioneered by Belinda Lim Sok Khoon as the Acting Principal and Hii Kwong Ing as the Senior Assistant of Student Affairs along with 878 students, 43 academic staff and 7 non-academic staff. During that time, 22 classes were assigned (from transition class until Form 4). Due to the small number of students, there were only a morning session for the class schedule.

In 2004, an afternoon session was added, thus making the school a two-session school (morning and afternoon) to accommodate the expansion into 31 classes for 1221 students, 59 academic staff and 11 non-academic staff.

In 2007, construction commenced on a school hall over the school's futsal court and was completed in the same year.

== Principals ==
#	Name of Principal	Took office	Left office
1	Belinda Lim Sok Khoon	2003	2004
2	Mary John	2004	2006
3	Fong Yut Kuen	2006	2020
4	Lau Yok Huck	2020	2022
5	Wong Nguk Chin	2022	2026
6	Dr. Ng Sing Yii	2026	

== Classes ==
The school currently has two transition classes, eleven Form 1 and ten Form 2 classes, nine Form 3, Form 4, and Form 5 classes, making it a total of 49 classes. However the school can add or subtract more classes if needed, such is the case of the batch of 2021 where the school added another Form 1 class. Form 4 and Form 5 classes are split into two streams, science and arts. Since the school has double sessions, the time of day allocated to certain classes is split. Afternoon classes are given to Transition, Form 1, and Form 2 students while morning classes are given to Form 3, Form 4, and Form 5 students.

Classes from Transition up to Form 3 are named after cities of varying countries such as Amsterdam, Frankfurt, Indianapolis to name a few. Unlike them however, classes from Form 4 and Form 5 have two different naming schemes for each stream. Science stream classes are typically named after the structure of an atom whereas art stream classes are named after different minerals.

Classes of SMK Jalan Arang
Transition	Form 1	Form 2	Form 3	Form 4	Form 5
Amanah	Amanah	Amanah	Amanah	Amanah	Amanah
Bestari	Bestari	Bestari	Bestari	Bestari	Bestari
Cerdas	Cerdas	Cerdas	Cerdas	Cerdas	Cerdas
	Dedikasi	Dedikasi	Dedikasi	Dedikasi	Dedikasi
	Efisien	Efisien	Efisien	Efisien	Efisien
	Futuristik	Futuristik	Futuristik	Futuristik	Futuristik
	Gigih	Gigih	Gigih	Gigih	Gigih
	Harmoni	Harmoni	Harmoni	Harmoni	Harmoni
	Ikhlas	Ikhlas	Ikhlas	Ikhlas	Ikhlas
	Jujur	Jujur	Jujur	Jujur	
		Komited		Komited	

== School magazine ==
The first school magazine was published in 2004 and has continued to be published in a yearly format. The magazine contains yearly achievements set by students in their examinations or cocurricular activities, various photos of school activities that have happened in the past year, essays written by the students in different languages, and photos of school clubs, classes, teachers, and students alike. In the year 2020 however, the school transitioned to a digital yearbook in the form of a video showcasing the pages of the yearbook. After the COVID-19 pandemic however, they transitioned back to using normal paperback magazines instead.

== Photos ==
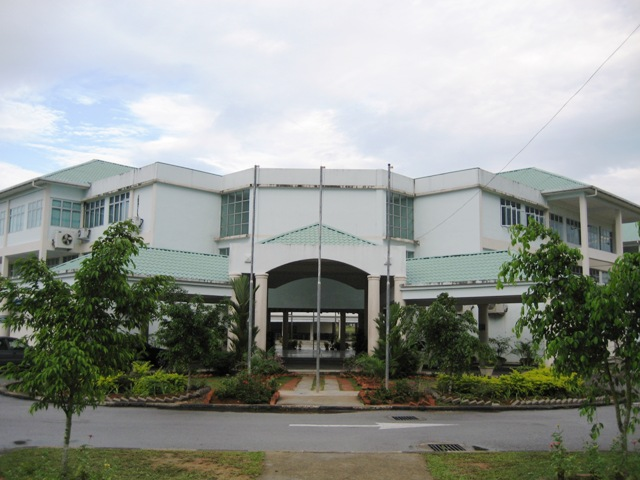
Front view

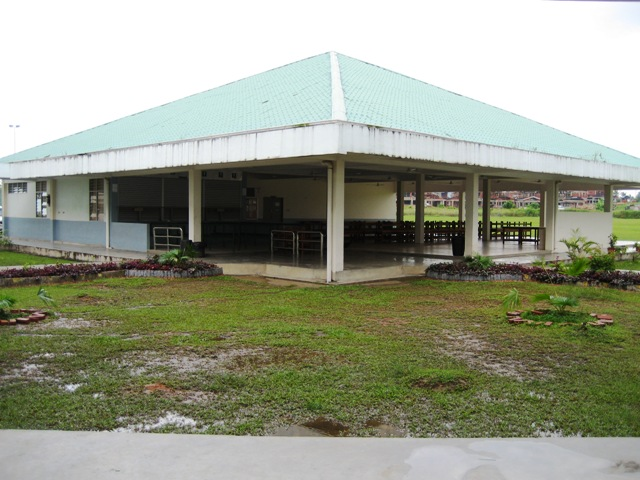
Canteen

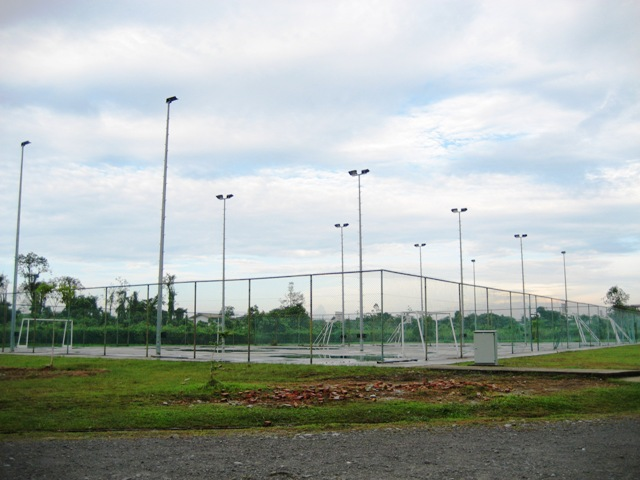
Basketball and Tennis Court

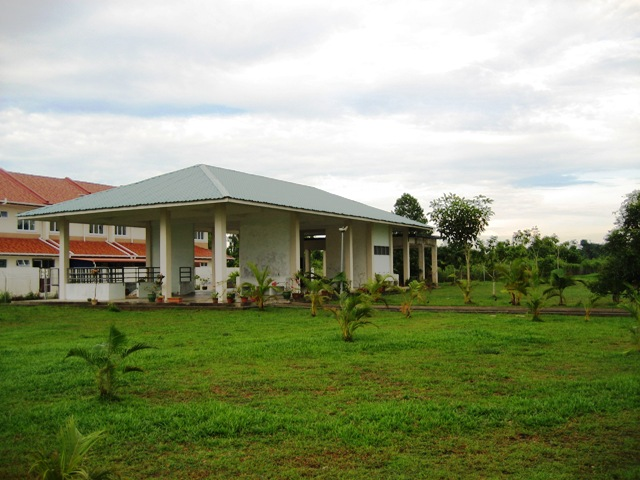
Green House

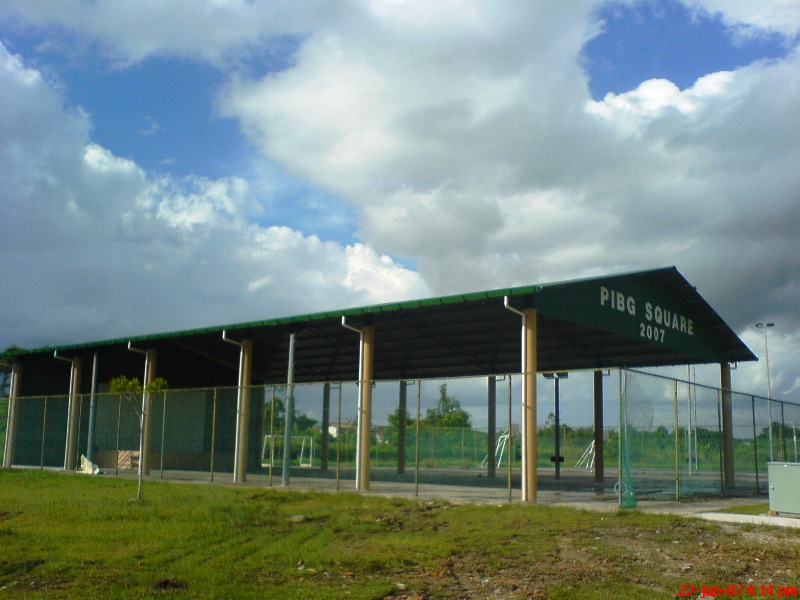
Assembly Hall

== See also ==
- SJK(C) Chung Hua 4 1/2
- Sekolah Kebangsaan Jalan Arang
