= Bintangor, Sarawak =

Bintangor
- Town and district capital

Other transcription(s)
  - Chinese: 民丹莪
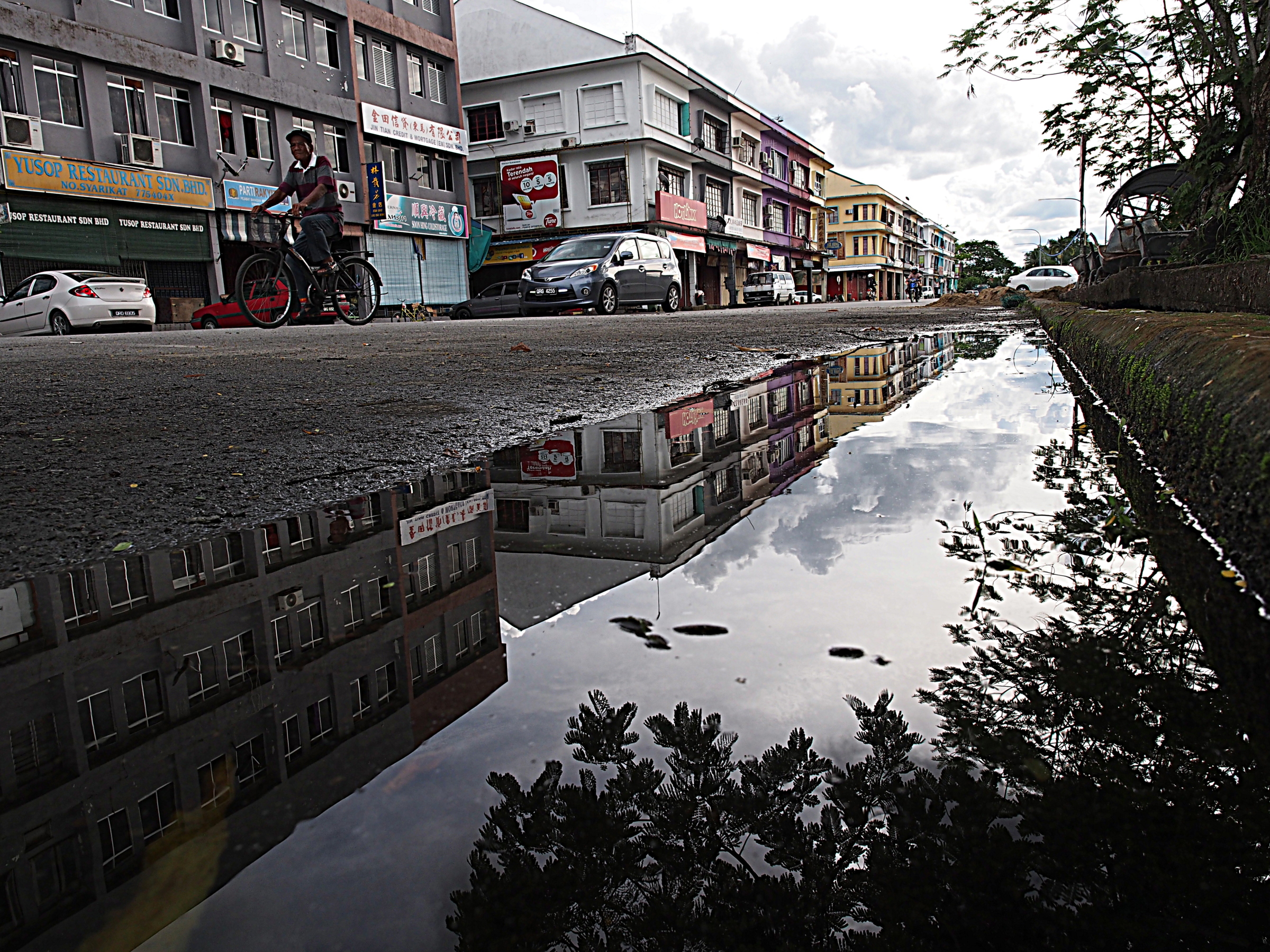
- Bintangor street view

- Flag Seal
- Nickname: Lime town (Note: Yii, 2010. Page 228)
- Location in Malaysia
- Coordinates: 2°9′56″N 111°38′3″E
- Country: Malaysia
- State: Sarawak
- Division: Sarikei
- District: Maradong
- Time zone: UTC+08:00 (Malaysian Standard Time)
- Postal code(s): 96500
- Area code: 084 (landline only)
- ISO 3166 code: Part of MY-13
- Vehicle registration: QR (for all vehicles except taxis); HQ (for taxis only)
- Website: www.maradong-julaudc.sarawak.gov.my

Bintangor (formerly known as Binatang) is a town, and the capital of the Meradong District in Sarikei Division, of Sarawak, Malaysia. Situated along the Rejang River, Bintangor was an express boat services hub connecting between, Sarikei town and Sibu city in the 1970s up to the early 1990s. As road connections between these towns became a more prominent mode of transport, the waterway of the town died down.

The town is widely known for its gastronomy, including the "Limau Bintangor" or Bintangor lime, "Bintangor Kampua" and Rojak Bintangor, a dish of fruit and vegetable dish mixed together by special sauce dressing. The nearest city from the town is Sibu, 45 minutes drive via the Highway 6308.

== Etymology ==
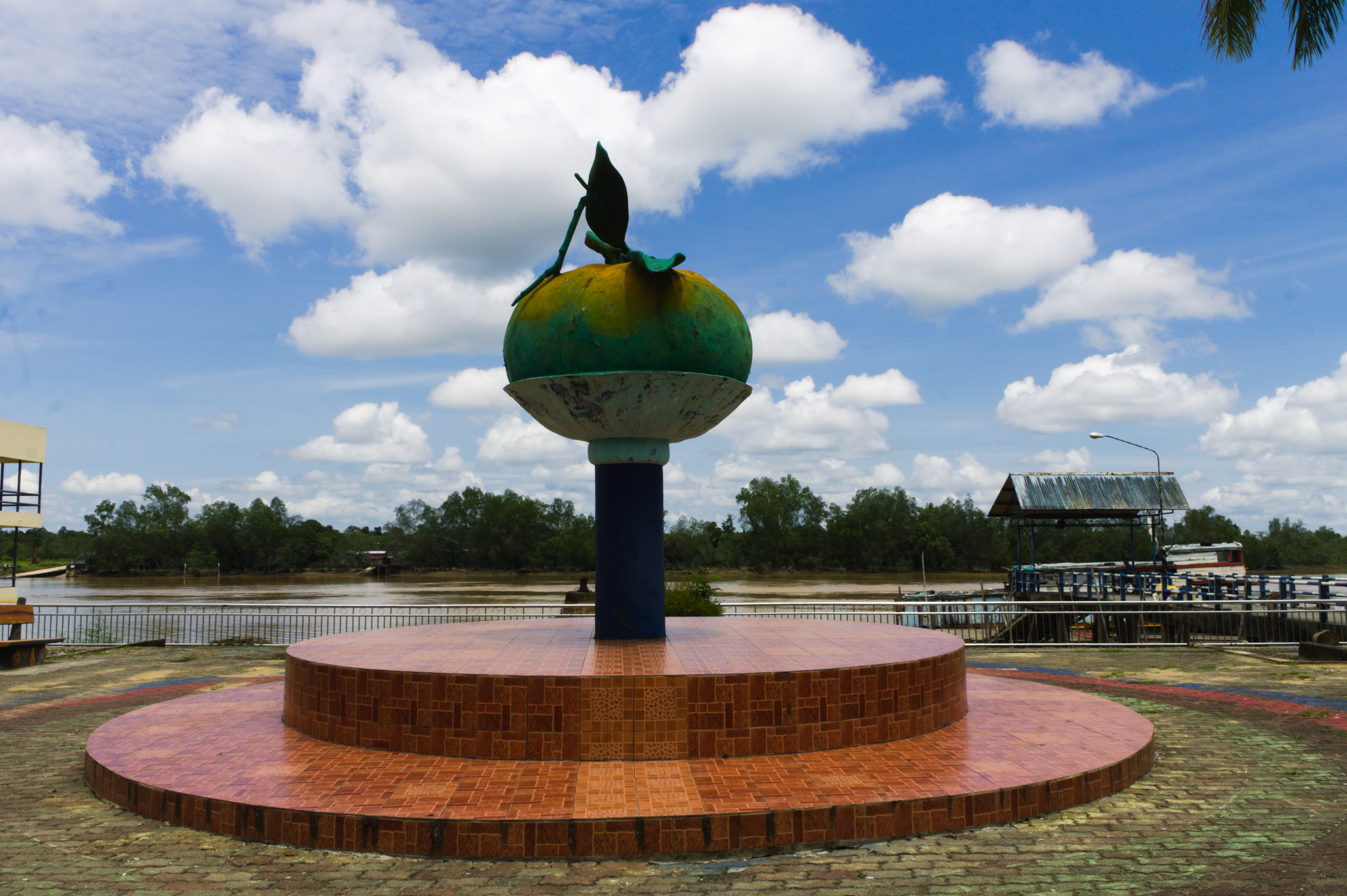
Lime as the symbol of Bintangor.

Meradong District was initially named as Binatang district and the town as Binatang town. In Malay language, Binatang literally translated as "animal". It was said that this area was once a fertile land with various wild fruits; attracting animals to gather here and search for food. Therefore, the early settlers named it Binatang. According to Ptolemy's Geography book written circa 150 AD, a location at the northwest tip of Borneo was described as Theriodes which means "animal" in Greek which tallies with Sanskrit "Tiryagja" and Malay "Binatang", presently still the name of a town near the mouth of the Rejang River. However, the local people later felt that the name was indecent and it was changed to Bintang (meaning "stars" in Malay). After a few years, the local authorities decided that the place name should not be changed so easily; and they reverted the name back to Binatang. (Note: Yii, 2010. Page 228) Finally, in 1984, after a discussion with district council members, Sarawak chief minister Abdul Taib Mahmud decided to change "Binatang" district into "Meradong" district and the town name to "Bintangor". (Note: Yii, 2010. Page 228) The name Meradong is derived from the river of the same name, which passes through the town before merging into the larger Rajang River. The name Bintangor is derived from the name of a tree which is found on the hills. The Calanolide A compound extracted from the Bintangor tree (Calophyllum lanigerum) is believed to be a vital component to treat HIV infection.

== History ==
In 1853, James Brooke was able to take over Rajang River and its surrounding settlements from the Brunei Sultanate. Before the 1900s, the population in Bintangor was sparse. In 1896, the Malays from Second Division (now Betong Division and Sri Aman Division) migrated here and established a settlement with villages of a dozen of houses near the riverside. The remaining areas were covered by forests at this point. (Note: Yii, 2010. Page 230) The Malays later moved away but was then requested by Rajah Brooke stay in the southern part of Bintangor so as to protect the early Chinese settlers against other natives in the region.

People from Zhangzhou and Xiamen were the first Chinese settlers in Bintangor. There was a documentation whereby a Chinese named Huang Zhi Yun (黄志云) bought a land in Bintangor in 1908. In 1910, Ling Ming Lok (林明乐) started planting vegetables in Bintangor. He found that the area was suitable for large-scale cultivation due to sparse population and large tracts of land. Therefore, Ming Lok together with Tiong Kung Ping and Rev Yao Siew King with the encouragement from Rev James Hoover, decided to open up Bintangor for agriculture. In 1917, Ming Lok invited the Chinese from the nearby settlement of Sibu to come to Bintangor. (Note: Yii, 2010. Page 239) They applied more lands from the Sibu Resident and his requests were granted. (Note: Yii, 2010. Page 229) As a result, large tracts of agricultural lands were opened for 300 Fuzhounese families. In 1922, Fuzhounese Chinese opened the first grocery shop in Bintangor. (Note: Yii, 2010. Page 231) Kai Nguong Church is the first Methodist church in Bintangor. In the same year, Kai Wen primary school (开文小学) was set up. (Note: Yii, 2010. Page 231) In 1923, the Brooke government established the "FooChow Land reclamation and Guidance Council" to manage issues regarding the opening up of lands and disputes among the Chinese land owners. (Note: Yii, 2010. Page 229) At first, there was only a few tailor shops, barber shops, and coffeeshops. The Chinese expanded their businesses to forestry, rice mill, and ice production. Bintangor had more than a dozen wooden shophouses by 1937; however, they were all razed to the ground by fire that same year. They were later relocated to another location. There were 24 shophouses by 1948. By 2010, this number had reached 47. (Note: Yii, 2010. Page 231,234) More schools such as Min Zhi primary school (民智小学) and Min Lu primary school (民鲁小学) were built later. (Note: Yii, 2010. Page 233)

Rubber plantations started to appear after 1922. (Note: Yii, 2010. Page 231) However, in 1929, the price of rubber was collapsing. The Brooke government started to employ Chinese workers to build roads to solve the unemployment problems due to fall in rubber price. In 1933, rubber price recovered. As of 2010, Bintangor had 10,000 acres of rubber plantations, producing 5,000 piculs every month. (Note: Yii, 2010. Page 233)

== Government ==
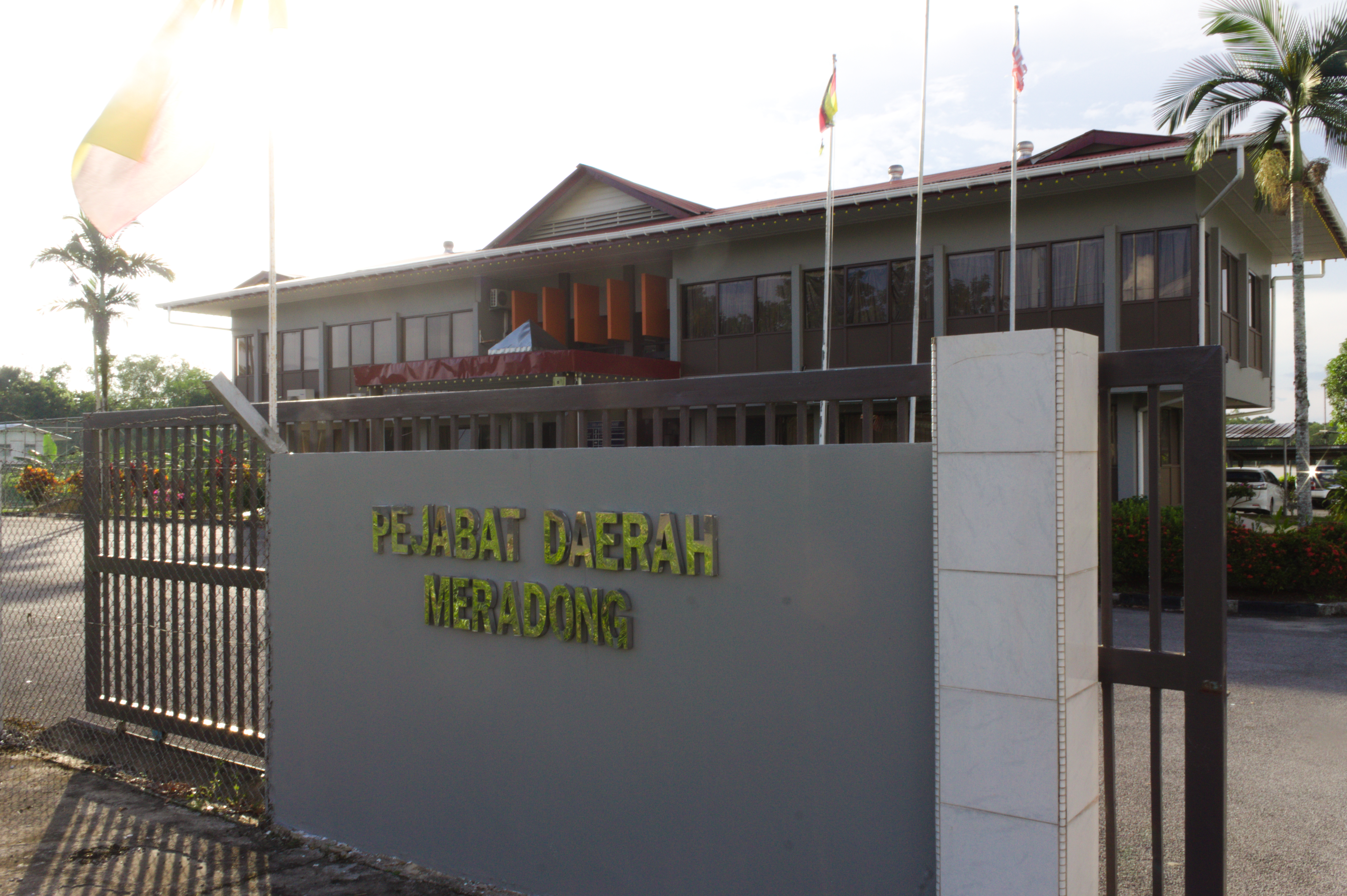
Meradong District Office

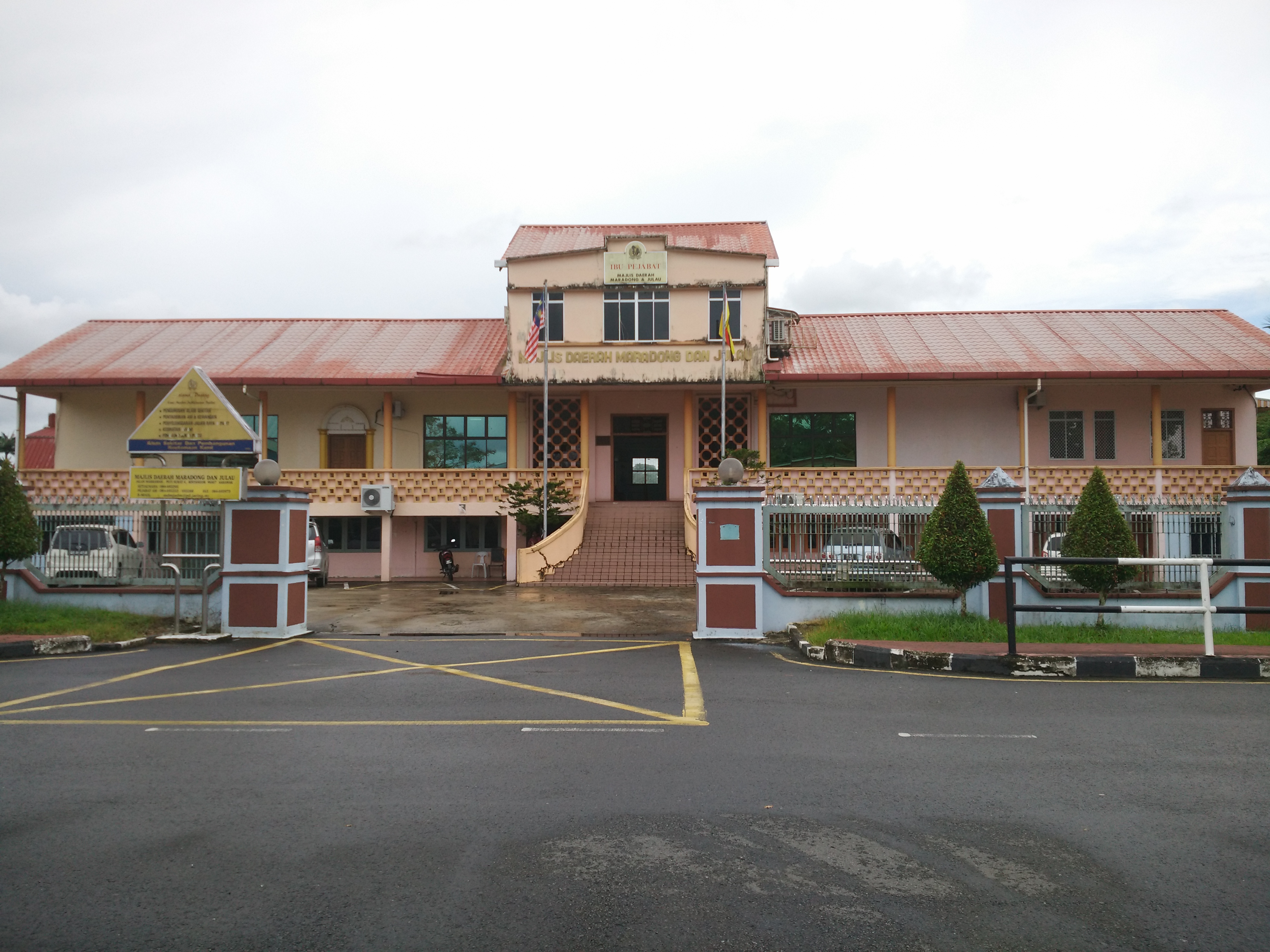
Meradong and Julau District Council Head Office

Binatang district council was set up in the 1947. The chairman of the council was rotated between the Chinese, Malay, and Iban people. In 1997, Binatang district council was divided into Meradong district council and Julau district council. (Note: Yii, 2010. Pages 229, 236) Bintangor is the capital of the Meradong District in the Sarikei Division.

== Geography ==
The Meradong district is located at 78 km from the mouth of the Rajang River. (Note: Yii, 2010. Page 229) Meanwhile, the Bintangor town is located between the mouths of Bintangor river and Meradong river, with an area of 1.63 km^{2}. (Note: Yii, 2010. Page 230) The northern part of the Meradong district is swampy with many small tributaries into the Rajang river. Majority of the Malays and the Iban people are staying in this area, with boats as their main form of transportation. Their major economic activities are agriculture and fishing. Meanwhile, the southern part of the Meradong district are mostly hilly. Most of the Chinese are staying in the southern area where they cultivate black pepper and cocoa. (Note: Yii, 2010. Page 229)

== Climate ==
Bintangor has a tropical rainforest climate (Af) with heavy to very heavy rainfall year-round.

Climate data for Bintangor
Month	Jan	Feb	Mar	Apr	May	Jun	Jul	Aug	Sep	Oct	Nov	Dec	Year
Mean daily maximum °C (°F)	30.3 (86.5)	30.6 (87.1)	31.5 (88.7)	32.2 (90.0)	32.7 (90.9)	32.4 (90.3)	32.3 (90.1)	31.9 (89.4)	31.9 (89.4)	31.8 (89.2)	31.5 (88.7)	31.0 (87.8)	31.7 (89.0)
Daily mean °C (°F)	26.3 (79.3)	26.5 (79.7)	27.1 (80.8)	27.4 (81.3)	27.9 (82.2)	27.5 (81.5)	27.2 (81.0)	27.0 (80.6)	27.2 (81.0)	27.2 (81.0)	26.9 (80.4)	26.7 (80.1)	27.1 (80.7)
Mean daily minimum °C (°F)	22.3 (72.1)	22.4 (72.3)	22.7 (72.9)	22.7 (72.9)	23.1 (73.6)	22.7 (72.9)	22.2 (72.0)	22.2 (72.0)	22.5 (72.5)	22.6 (72.7)	22.4 (72.3)	22.4 (72.3)	22.5 (72.5)
Average rainfall mm (inches)	355 (14.0)	272 (10.7)	276 (10.9)	244 (9.6)	216 (8.5)	179 (7.0)	180 (7.1)	215 (8.5)	263 (10.4)	272 (10.7)	282 (11.1)	354 (13.9)	3,108 (122.4)
Source: Climate-Data.org

== Demographics ==
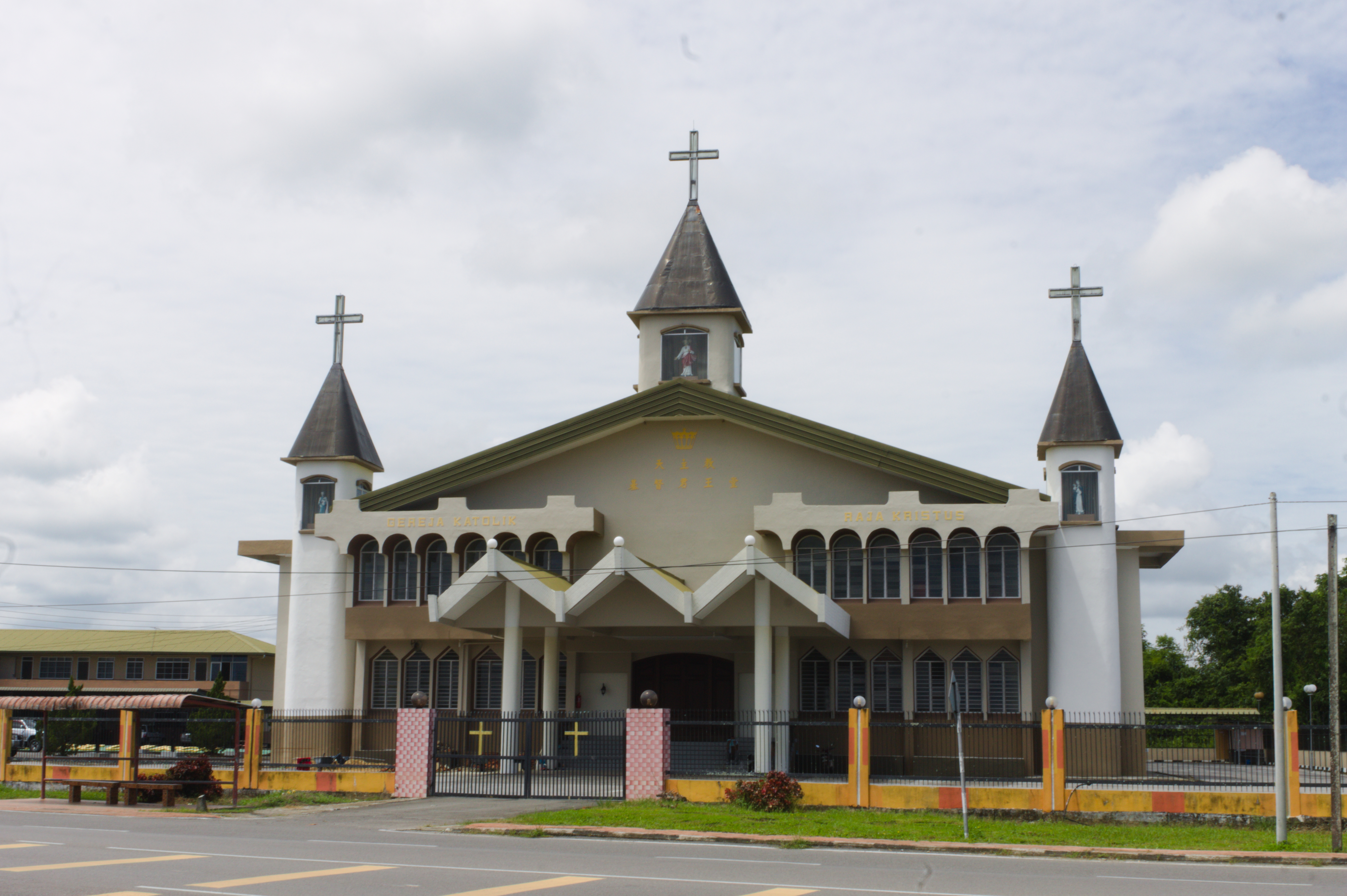
Christ The King Catholic church

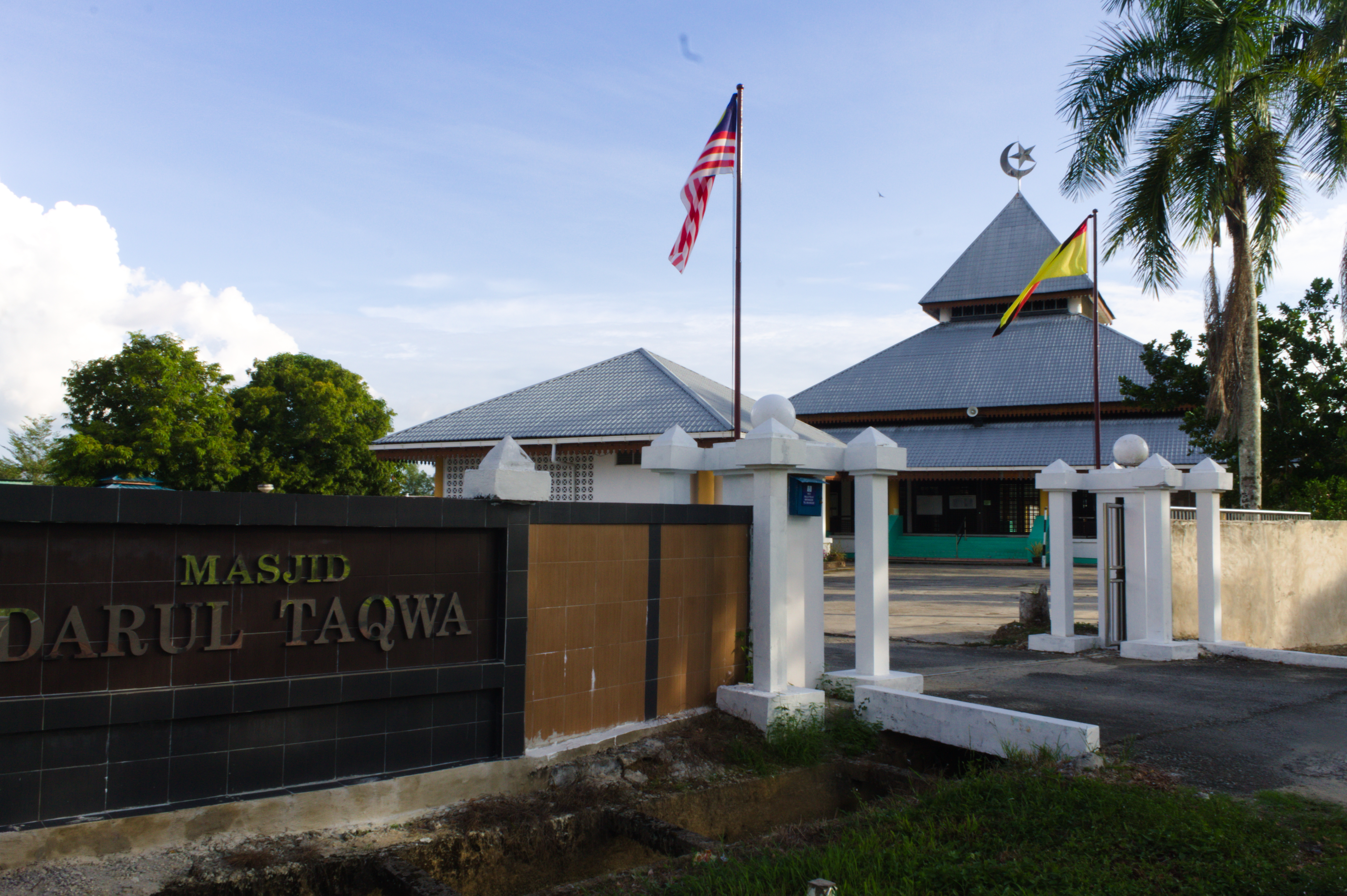
Darul Taqwa mosque

The Chinese (mostly Fuzhounese), Malays, and Iban people forms the majority of the ethnic groups in the Bintangor town. (Note: Yii, 2010. Page 229) In 1922, there were 300 people staying in Bintangor. This number increased to 2,000 people in 1930, followed by 4,000 people in 1940, and 9,000 people in 1950. (Note: Yii, 2010. Page 234, 235) Majority of the Chinese people in Bintangor are Christians. (Note: Yii, 2010. Page 235)

== Economy ==
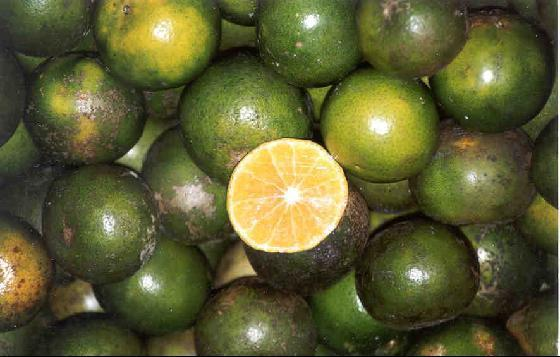
Bintangor is notable for its production of green lime, notably called the Bintangor Lime.

In 1927, Catholic missionary from Netherlands named Father Bergh first introduced lime to Bintangor. Ling Ming Lok was the first person who successfully cultivated the lime near the Rajang river. (Note: Yii, 2010. Page 239) Mass production of lime with unique taste has earned the town the nickname "lime town" (桔子城). (Note: Yii, 2010. Page 239) There was once a factory in Bintangor which produced the "Green Mountain" brand of lime beverages, but with the competition from the outside branded soft-drink manufacturers, the factory was closed down. Rice mills and sago mills operations were the main economic activities at that time.

Besides, Bintangor also cultivated honey pomelo.

== Transport ==
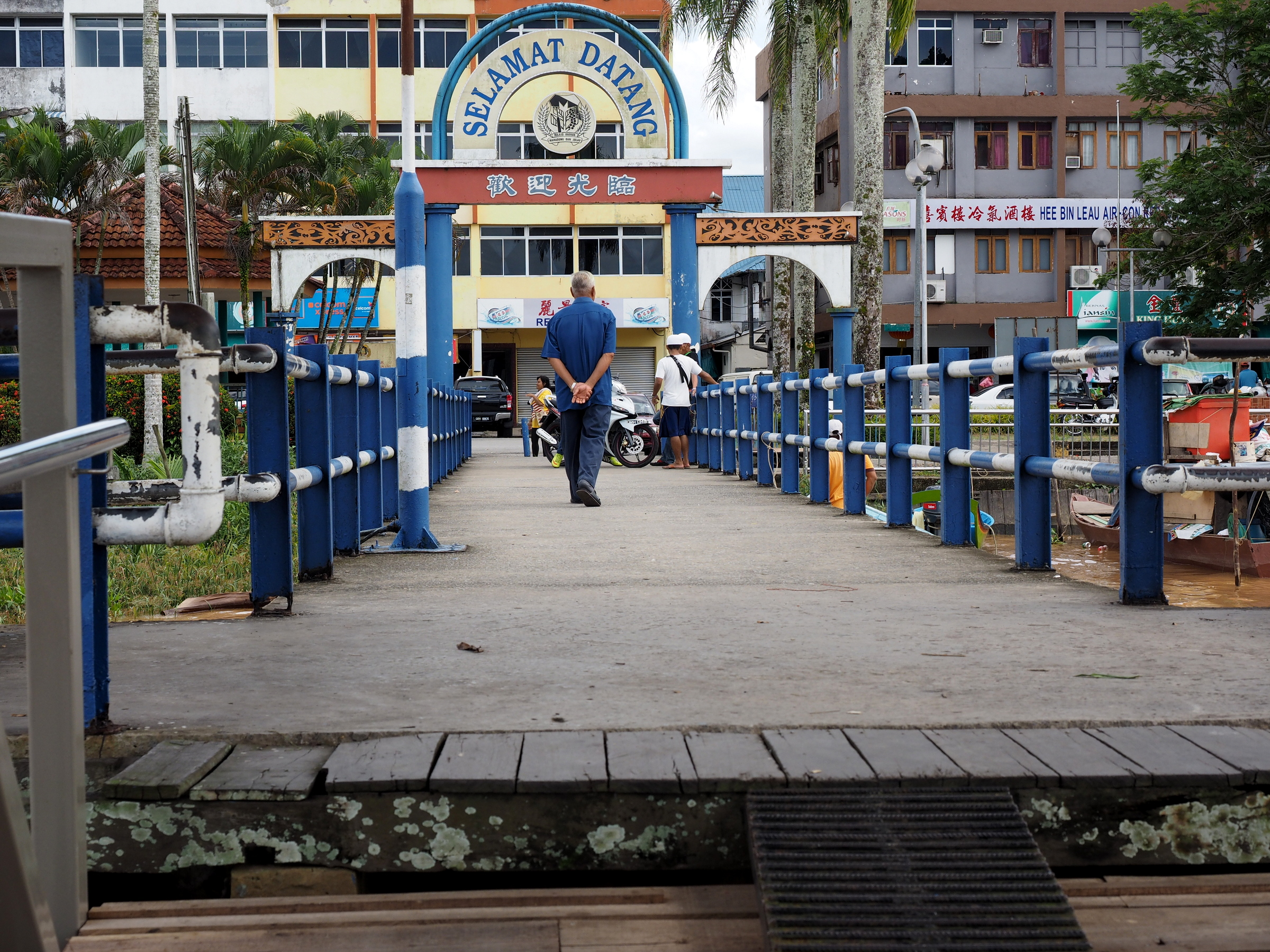
The welcome gate of the Bintangor wharf terminal

During the early days, there were only footpaths in the town. After that, local people dig up drains along the footpath. (Note: Yii, 2010. Page 231) Water was popular form of transport when there were no proper roads in Bintangor. Taking express boats between Sibu and Sarikei was four hours, meanwhile, it only takes one and a half-hour to reach Bintangor from Sarikei. (Note: Yii, 2010. Page 234) The express boats carries passengers, rubber sheets, baskets of fresh fruits, and other agricultural products to Sibu while bringing canned food, beer, bottled drinks, and other sundry goods back to Bintangor. The once busy Bintangor wharf became irrelevant after road connections become more advanced in the 1980s. There are several bridges in Bintangor: Nyelong bridge and the Red Bridge. It takes 35 minutes to drive from Sibu to Bintangor through the Lanang Bridge.

=== Local Bus ===
Route No.	Operating Route	Operator
8A	Bintangor-Sibu	Borneo Bus
8B	Sarikei-Sibu	Borneo Bus

== Other utilities ==
=== Education ===
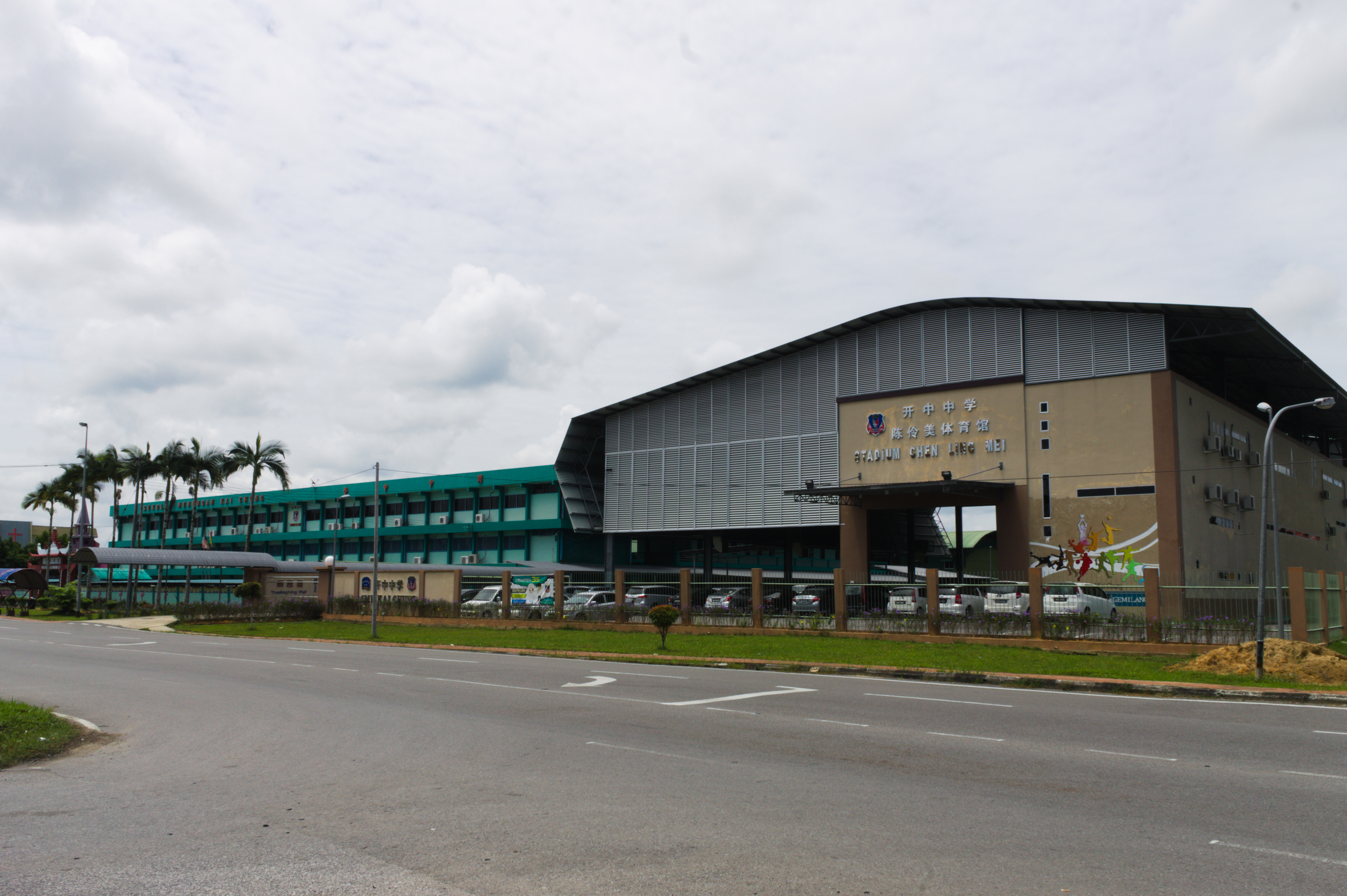
Kai Chung secondary school

Opened in 1922 above a drug store shophouse, Kai Wen primary school (开文小学) is the first school in Bintangor. At first, there were six pupils, which slowly increased to 20 pupils. (Note: Yii, 2010. Page 242) In 1946, the school was combined with school named China primary school (中国小学) to form Kai Chung school (开中学校). In 1982, the number of pupils totaled at 1,280. (Note: Yii, 2010. Page 255) In 1986, the school was officially separated into primary and secondary schools. (Note: Yii, 2010. Page 254)

Another primary school established in Bintangor is the Abang Amin school. Established in 1935, and named after an influential Malay leader in charge of peace in the area by the Brooke administration, Abang Amin Bin Abang Bujang. Built by communal work by the people in the area after his death and to commemorate his services to the community, the school started with 40 pupils on the first year of its founding. In 1938, the school moved location to the current location to accommodate larger number of pupils. In 1973, the school is incorporated into the government school system, turning it into a full-fledged national primary school.

Currently, Bintangor town has four secondary schools, SMK Meradong, SMK Bandar Bintangor, Kai Chung Secondary School and SMK Tong Hua.

There are also 32 primary schools, of which 18 are national schools (SK) and 14 are national type schools (SJK(c)). Malaysian Teachers Education Institute (Malay: Institut Pendidikan Guru Malaysia) Rajang Campus is also situated at about 17 kilometres from Bintangor town.

=== Healthcare ===
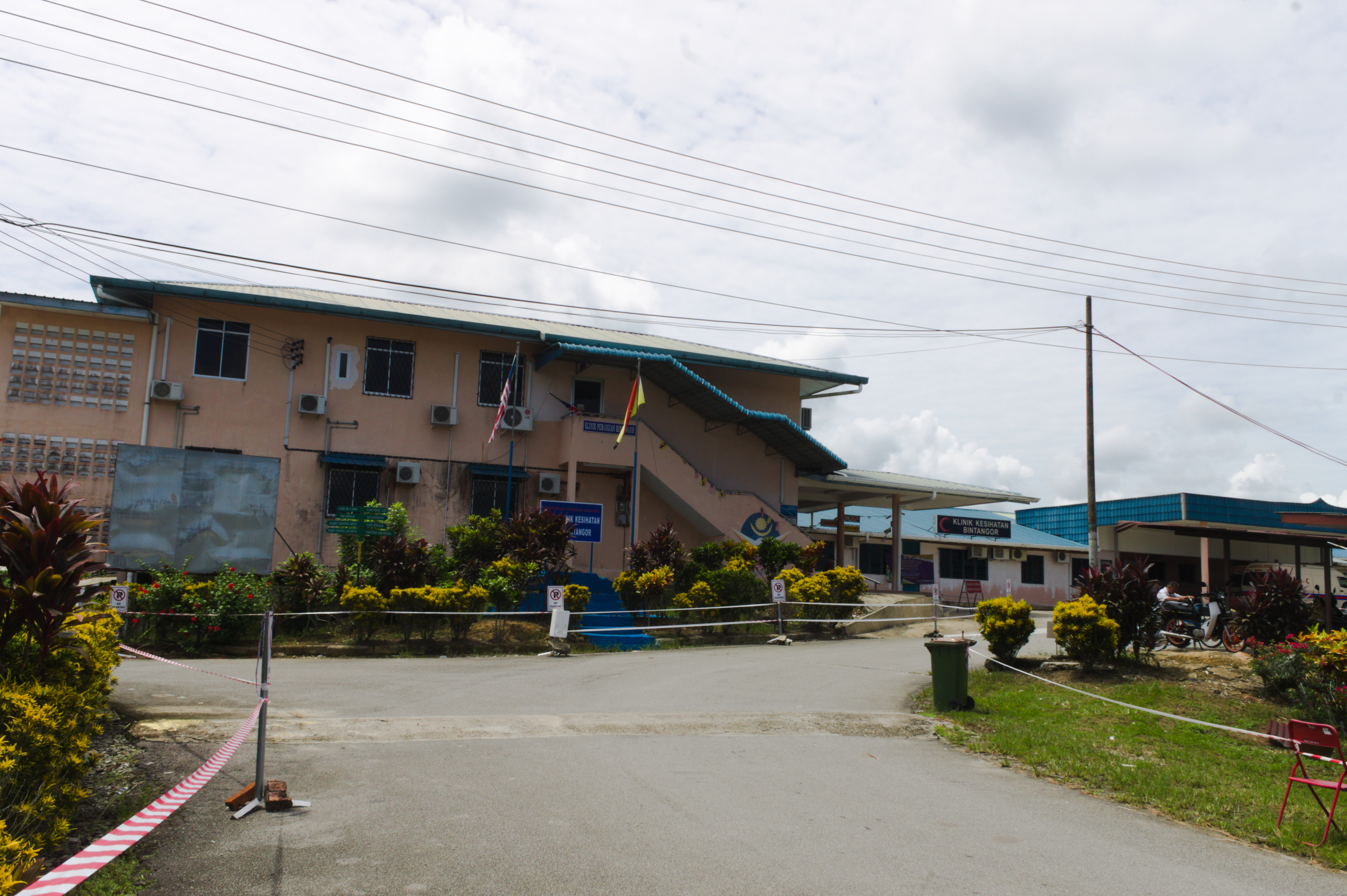
Bintangor health clinic

== Culture and leisure ==
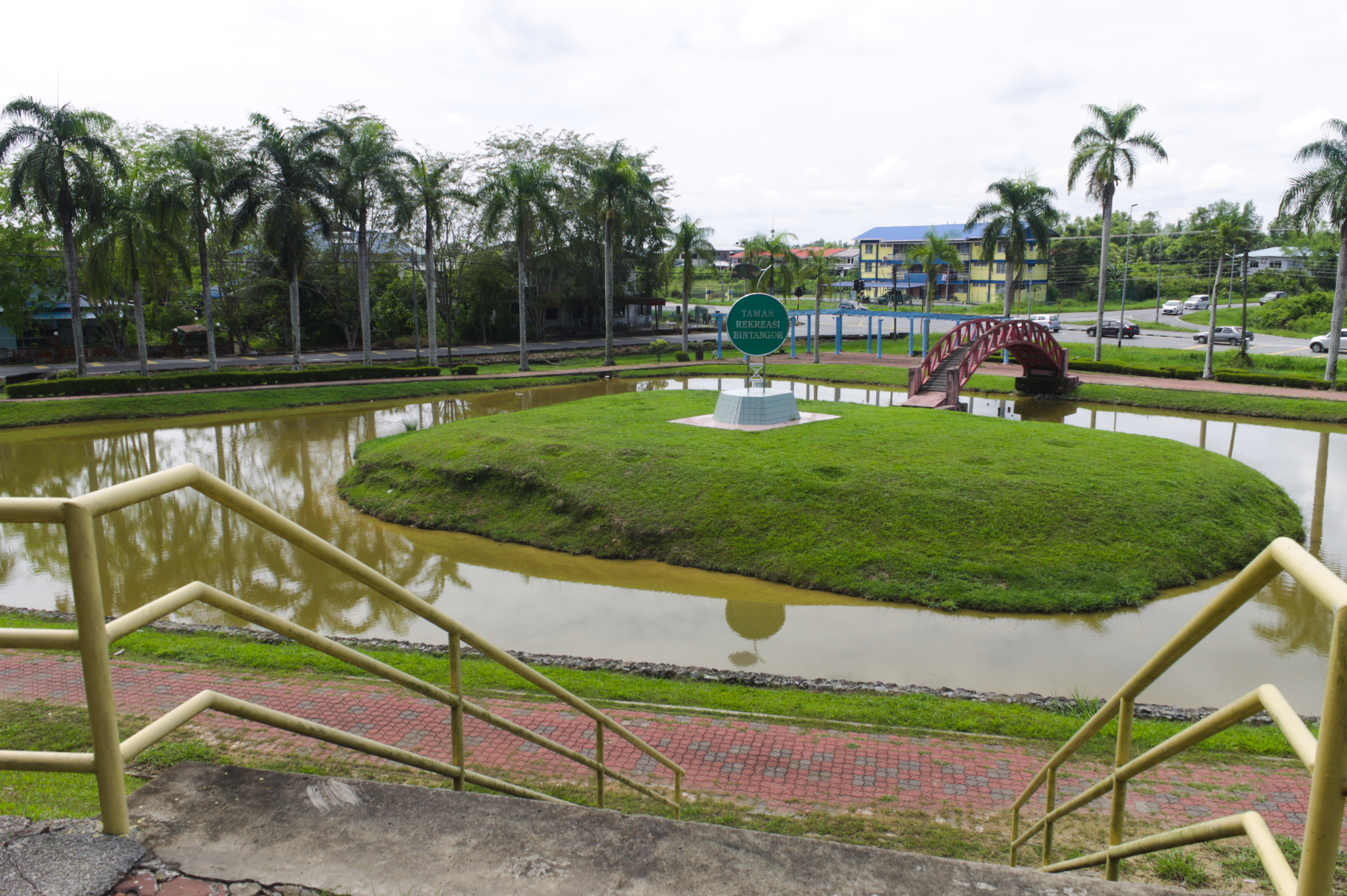
Bintangor recreational park

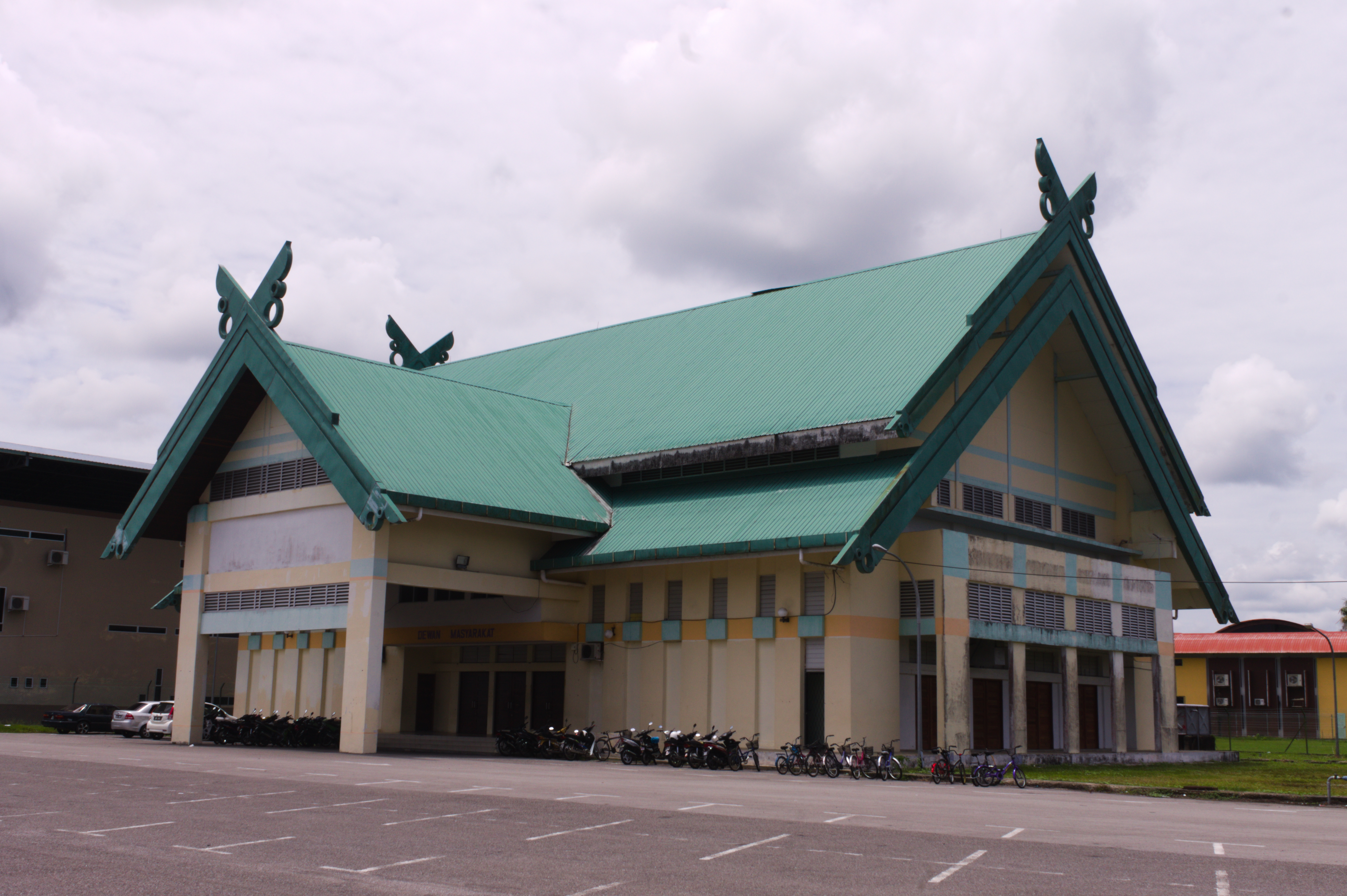
Bintangor community hall

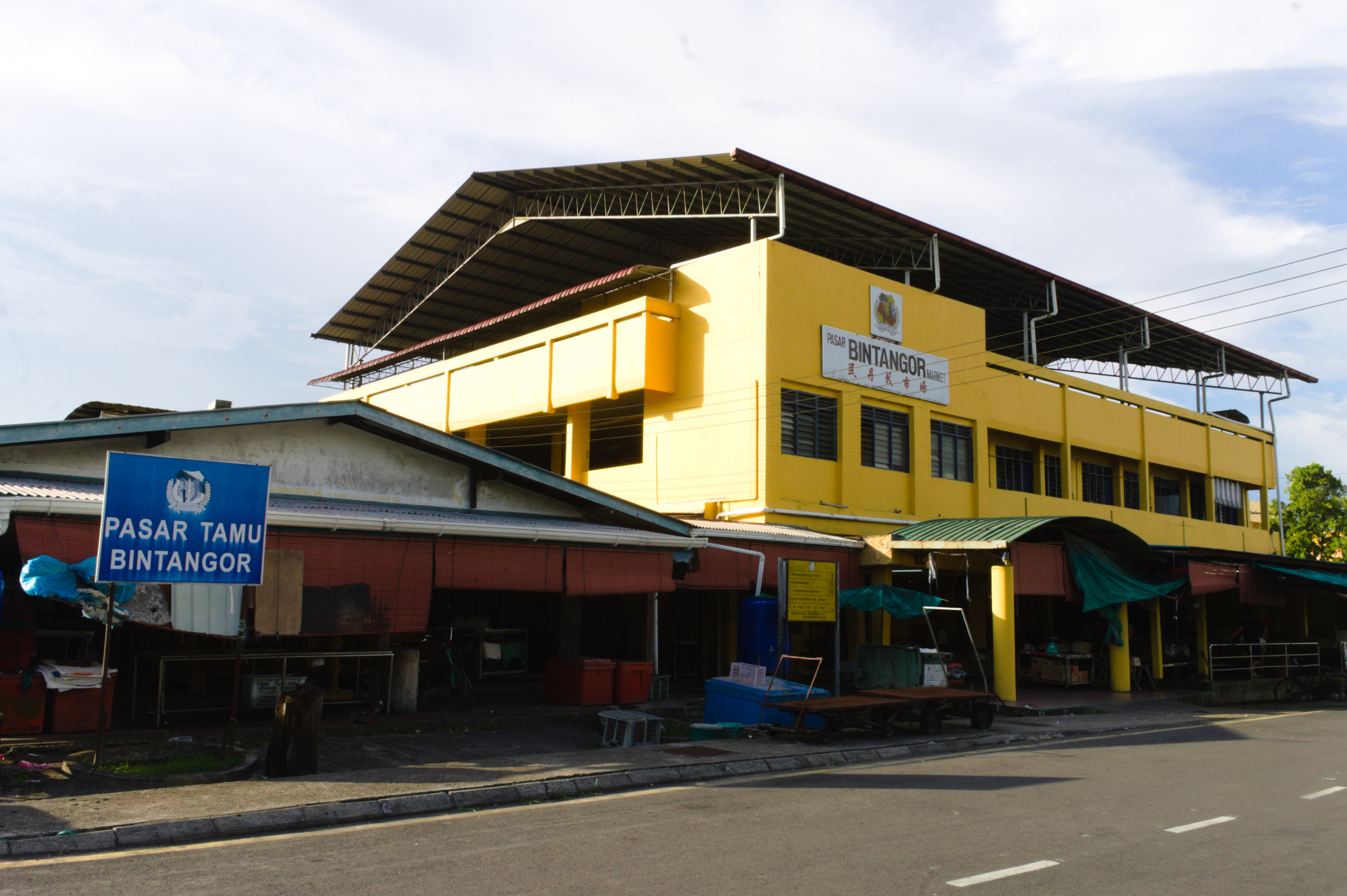
The Bintangor market

== Cuisine ==
Notable foods in the town are Tumpik Bintangor and Rojak Bintangor. Tumpik Bintangor is a type of pizza made by sago. Rojak Bintangor is made of cucumber, soya, waterchestnuts mixed with prawn paste.
