= Nyabor =

- Location within Borneo
- Coordinates: 1.95°N 111.2°E
- Country: Malaysia
- State: Sarawak
- Elevation: 1 m (3.3 ft)

Nyabor is a settlement in Sarawak, Malaysia. It lies approximately 104.7 kilometres (65.1 mi) east-north-east of the state capital Kuching. Neighbouring settlements include:

- Kampung Peruntong 0 kilometres (0.0 mi) north
- Nanga Plasu 3.7 kilometres (2.3 mi) east
- Rumah Kelali 3.7 kilometres (2.3 mi) north
