= List of bridges in Malaysia =

== Historical and architectural interest bridges ==
Photo		Name	Malaysian Malay	Distinction	Length	Type	Carries Crosses	Opened	Location	State	Ref.
	1	Petronas Towers Skybridge		Walkway joining the two Petronas Towers 170 metres (560 ft) above the ground	58 m (190 ft)	Beam bridge Steel	Footbridge	1998	Kuala Lumpur; 3°9′29.3″N 101°42′44.9″E	Kuala Lumpur	
	2	Langkawi Sky Bridge	Jambatan Udara Langkawi	Curved cable-stayed bridge 660 metres (2,170 ft) above sea level Swiss Steel Design Award 2005	125 m (410 ft)	Cable-stayed; Steel truss deck, 1 steel inlcined pylon	Footbridge; Gunung Mat Cincang	2005	Langkawi; 6°23′11.3″N 99°39′44.5″E	Kedah	
	3	Sunway Lagoon Suspension Bridge		Bungee jumping spot Span : 428 m (1,404 ft)	428 m (1,404 ft)	Suspension; Steel	Footbridge; Sunway Lagoon (amusement park)		Subang Jaya; 3°4′10.5″N 101°36′25.5″E	Selangor	
	4	Darul Hana Bridge			300 m (980 ft)	Cable-stayed; Steel truss deck, inclined steel pylons	Footbridge; Sarawak River	2017	Kuching; 1°33′41.1″N 110°20′45.6″E	Sarawak	
	5	Kuala Terengganu Drawbridge	Jambatan Angkat Kuala Terengganu	Inspired by the Tower Bridge in London	672 m (2,205 ft)	Beam bridge Composite steel/concrete Bascule bridge	Road bridge Terengganu River	2019	Kuala Terengganu; 5°20′22.9″N 103°08′41.3″E	Terengganu	

== Major bridges ==
This table presents a non-exhaustive list of the road and railway bridges with spans greater than 100 metres (328 ft) or total lengths longer than 1,000 metres (3,281 ft).

	Name	Malaysian Malay	Span	Length	Type	Carries Crosses	Opened	Location	State	Ref.
1	Batang Lupar 1 Bridge	Jambatan Batang Lupar 1	600 m (2,000 ft)	4,884 m (16,024 ft)	Cable-stayed; Concrete pylons	Sarawak Coastal Road; Lupar River	2026	Sebuyau–Kampung Teriso; 1°30′49.3″N 110°58′37.3″E	Sarawak	
2	Sungai Johor Bridge	Jambatan Sungai Johor	500 m (1,600 ft)	1,708 m (5,604 ft)	Cable-stayed; Steel box girder deck, concrete pylons	Senai–Desaru Expressway; Johor River	2011	Johor Bahru; 1°31′42″N 104°1′26″E	Johor	
3	Sungai Sarawak Bridge under construction	Jambatan Sungai Sarawak	400 m (1,300 ft)	1,300 m (4,300 ft)	Cable-stayed; Concrete pylons 200+400+200	Sarawak Coastal Road; Sarawak River	2025	Kuching; 1°34′45.7″N 110°25′13.8″E	Sarawak	
4	Seri Saujana Bridge	Jambatan Seri Saujana	300 m (980 ft)		Hybrid bridge Arch; Steel through arch Cable-stayed; Concrete box girder deck, concrete pylons	Lebuh Sentosa; Putrajaya Lake	2003	Putrajaya; 2°54′48.1″N 101°40′35.3″E	Putrajaya	
5	Bintulu-Jepak Bridge	Jambatan Batang Bintulu	267 m (876 ft)	1,283 m (4,209 ft)	Cable-stayed; Concrete pylons 108+267+108	Sarawak Coastal Road; Kemena River	2025	Bintulu; 3°10′35.1″N 113°02′00.1″E	Sarawak	
6	Penang Second Bridge	Jambatan Kedua Pulau Pinang	240 m (790 ft)	16,900 m (55,400 ft)	Cable-stayed; Concrete girder deck, concrete pylons 117+240+117	Expressway 28; Penang Strait	2014	Seberang Perai–Penang Island; 5°16′59.3″N 100°18′35.0″E	Penang	(Note: The official name is Sultan Abdul Halim Muadzam Shah Bridge.)
7	Monorail Suspension Bridge	Jambatan Gantung Monorel	240 m (790 ft)		Suspension; Steel girder deck, concrete pylons	Putrajaya Monorail; Putrajaya Lake		Putrajaya; 2°54′57.9″N 101°40′45″E	Putrajaya	
8	Penang Bridge	Jambatan Pulau Pinang	225 m (738 ft)	8,400 m (27,600 ft)	Cable-stayed; Concrete girder deck, concrete pylons 107+225+107	Expressway 36; Penang Strait	1985	Seberang Perai–Penang Island; 5°21′14.7″N 100°20′47.1″E	Penang	
9	Batang Sadong Bridge	Jambatan Batang Sadong	200 m (660 ft)(x2)	1,480 m (4,860 ft)	Box girder Prestressed concrete 140+150+175+2x200 +175+150+140	Sarawak Coastal Road; Sadong River	2016	Asajaya District–Simunjan District; 1°26′50.3″N 110°41′23.2″E	Sarawak	
10	Muara Lassa Bridge	Jambatan Muara Lassa	200 m (660 ft)(x2)	2,430 m (7,970 ft)	Box girder Prestressed concrete	Sarawak Coastal Road; Muara Lassa River	2025	Daro District–Tanjung Manis District; 2°32′40.7″N 111°23′12.5″E	Sarawak	
11	Batang Paloh Bridge under construction	Jambatan Batang Paloh	200 m (660 ft)	1,700 m (5,600 ft)	Box girder Prestressed concrete	Sarawak Coastal Road; Paloh River	2023	Daro District; 2°22′30.7″N 111°25′36.7″E	Sarawak	
12	Batang Saribas Bridge under construction	Jambatan Batang Saribas	200 m (660 ft)(x2)	1,550 m (5,090 ft)	Box girder Prestressed concrete 90+150+175+2x200 +175+150+90	Sarawak Coastal Road; Saribas River	2023	Pusa–Beladin; 1°37′27.7″N 111°16′06.7″E	Sarawak	
13	Prai River Bridge	Jambatan Sungai Prai	185 m (607 ft)	1,850 m (6,070 ft)	Cable-stayed; Concrete box girder deck, concrete pylons 2x50+185+2x50	Butterworth Outer Ring Road; Perai River	2006	Butterworth; 5°23′22.5″N 100°22′34.4″E	Penang	
14	ASEAN Bridge		180 m (590 ft)	1,040 m (3,410 ft)	Box girder Prestressed concrete 110+180+110	Federal Route 1 Miri–Baram Highway; Pan-Borneo Highway; Baram River	2003	Miri; 4°33′48.1″N 114°04′24.9″E	Sarawak	
15	Lanang Bridge	Jambatan Lanang	180 m (590 ft)(x2)	1,194 m (3,917 ft)	Box girder Prestressed concrete 110+2x180+110	Federal Route 6308B; Rajang River	2006	Sibu; 2°14′38.3″N 111°49′57.3″E	Sarawak	
16	Batang Samarahan Bridge	Jambatan Batang Samarahan	178 m (584 ft)	774 m (2,539 ft)	Box girder Prestressed concrete 98+178+98	Sarawak Coastal Road; Sabang River	2018	Kota Samarahan–Asajaya District; 1°30′02.7″N 110°29′57.0″E	Sarawak	
17	Seri Wawasan Bridge	Jambatan Seri Wawasan	168 m (551 ft)	240 m (790 ft)	Cable-stayed; Concrete box girder deck, 1 composite steel/concrete inclined pylon	Lebuh Wawasan; Putrajaya Lake	2003	Putrajaya; 2°55′41.1″N 101°41′2.6″E	Putrajaya	
18	Malaysia–Singapore Second Link	Laluan Kedua Malaysia-Singapura	165 m (541 ft)	1,919 m (6,296 ft)	Box girder Prestressed concrete 96+165+96	Second Link Expressway; Johor River; Straits of Johor	1998	Johor Bahru; 1°21′9.3″N 103°37′49.6″E	Johor– Singapore	
19	Seredeng Bridge		165 m (541 ft)		Box girder Prestressed concrete 95+165+95	Road bridge			Sarawak	
20	Sultan Yusuf Bridge	Jambatan Sultan Yusuf	160 m (520 ft)	1,153 m (3,783 ft)	Box girder Prestressed concrete 95+160+95	West Coast Expressway; Federal Route 5 Perak River	1988	Teluk Intan; 3°58′3.6″N 100°58′25.9″E	Perak	
21	Pulai River Bridge	Jambatan Sungai Pulai	160 m (520 ft)	2,100 m (6,900 ft)	Box girder Prestressed concrete	Road bridge Pulai River	2023	Gelang Patah; 1°22′46.3″N 103°32′11.7″E	Johor	
22	Batang Rambungan Bridge under construction	Jambatan Batang Rambungan	160 m (520 ft)	560 m (1,840 ft)	Cable-stayed; Concrete pylons 80+160+80	Sarawak Coastal Road; Rambungan River	2023	Kuching; 1°39′47.8″N 110°07′18.9″E	Sarawak	
23	Durin Bridge	Jambatan Durin	150 m (490 ft)(x3)	1,190 m (3,900 ft)	Box girder Prestressed concrete Twin bridges 100+3x150+100	Federal Route 1 Miri–Baram Highway; Rajang River	2006; 2020	Sibu–Durin; 2°09′22.6″N 112°00′51.7″E	Sarawak	
24	Marudi Bridge under construction	Jambatan Marudi	150 m (490 ft)	650 m (2,130 ft)	Box girder Prestressed concrete 90+150+90	Baram River	2025	Baram District; 4°11′23.0″N 114°18′48.2″E	Sarawak	
25	Pulau Poh Bridge	Jambatan Pulau Poh	133 m (436 ft)		Cable-stayed; Steel deck and pylon	Road bridge Kenyir Lake	2023	Kuala Berang; 5°08′12.2″N 102°48′06.1″E	Terengganu	
26	Muar Second Bridge	Jambatan Kedua Muar	132 m (433 ft)	632 m (2,073 ft)	Cable-stayed; Concrete box girder deck, concrete pylons 32+34+132+34+32	Federal Route 5 Muar Bypass; Muar River	2004	Muar; 2°4′37.1″N 102°33′14.1″E	Johor	
27	Subang–Kelana Jaya Link Bridge over Federal Route 2		130 m (430 ft)		Box girder Prestressed concrete 95+130+90	Subang–Kelana Jaya Link; Federal Route 2 Railway line	2009	Subang Jaya; 3°05′04.5″N 101°35′35.2″E	Selangor	
28	Seri Gemilang Bridge	Jambatan Seri Gemilang	120 m (390 ft)	233 m (764 ft)	Arch; Concrete deck arch 60+120+60	Road bridge Putrajaya Lake	2003	Putrajaya; 2°54′0.1″N 101°40′45″E	Putrajaya	
29	Sungai Seblak Bridge	Jambatan Sungai Seblak	120 m (390 ft)		Box girder Prestressed concrete 65+120+65	Road bridge Seblak River	2005	Kabong District; 1°53′27.5″N 111°11′03.7″E	Sarawak	
30	Pulau Sekati Bridge	Jambatan Pulau Sekati	120 m (390 ft)		Box girder Prestressed concrete 85+120+85	Kuala Terengganu Bypass; Terengganu River	2017	Kuala Terengganu; 5°19′16.9″N 103°05′37.4″E	Terengganu	
31	Ibai River Bridge		100 m (330 ft)	315 m (1,033 ft)	Box girder Prestressed concrete 65+100+65	Federal Route 3 Ibai River	1997	Kuala Terengganu; 5°16′42.2″N 103°10′8.3″E	Terengganu	
32	Tasek Kenyir Bridge		100 m (330 ft)	240 m (790 ft)	Box girder Prestressed concrete 70+100+70	Second East–West Highway; Kenyir Lake		Hulu Terengganu District; 5°03′58.0″N 102°34′32.6″E	Terengganu	
33	Padas River Bridge	Jambatan Sungai Padas	100 m (330 ft)	220 m (720 ft)	Box girder Prestressed concrete 60+100+60	Road bridge Padas River		Beaufort; 5°21′07.2″N 115°43′35.4″E	Sabah	
34	Batang Lupar 2 Bridge under construction	Jambatan Batang Lupar 2			Cable-stayed; Concrete pylons	Sarawak Coastal Road; Lupar River	2024	Simanggang; 1°15′13.4″N 111°27′35.3″E	Sarawak	
35	Limbang Bridge under construction	Jambatan Limbang		830 m (2,720 ft)	Cable-stayed; Concrete pylons	Limbang River		Limbang; 4°46′42.5″N 114°59′39.1″E	Sarawak	
36	Batang Igan Bridge under construction	Jambatan Batang Igan		1,400 m (4,600 ft)	Cable-stayed; Concrete pylons	Sarawak Coastal Road; Igan River	2024	Kampung Sekerang Igan; 2°48′30.3″N 111°43′22.5″E	Sarawak	
37	Lebaan Bridge	Jambatan Lebaan		1,240 m (4,070 ft)	Box girder Prestressed concrete	Sibu-Tanjung Manis Highway; Lebaan River	2010	Sibu–Tanjung Manis District; 2°19′37.1″N 111°40′01.6″E	Sarawak	
38	Batang Rajang Bridge under construction	Jambatan Batang Rajang		1,200 m (3,900 ft)	Box girder Prestressed concrete	Sarawak Coastal Road; Rajang River	2023	Sarikei–Bintangor; 2°11′11.9″N 111°33′56.6″E	Sarawak	
39	Batang Mukah Bridge	Jambatan Batang Mukah			Arch; Steel through arch	Federal Route 3112; Mukah River	2005	Mukah; 2°53′41.3″N 112°06′41.1″E	Sarawak	
40	Sungai Krian Bridge under construction	Jambatan Sungai Krian		690 m (2,260 ft)	Box girder Prestressed concrete	Sarawak Coastal Road; Sungai Krian	2025	Kabong District; 1°44′01.4″N 111°11′24.7″E	Sarawak	
41	Sitompok Bridge	Jambatan Sitompok		1,100 m (3,600 ft)	Box girder Prestressed concrete	Jin Bandau Kuala Penyu; Sitompok River	2013	Sabah District; 5.5655°N 115.5961°E	Kuala Penyu	

== Planned bridges ==
	Name	Malaysian Malay	Span	Length	Type	Carries Crosses	Opened	Location	State	Ref.
1	Malacca Strait Bridge project	Jambatan Selat Melaka		48,000 m (157,000 ft)	Suspension; Cable-stayed	Road bridge Strait of Malacca		Masjid Tanah–Rupat; 2°15′00.0″N 101°45′00.0″E	Malacca; Indonesia	

== See also ==
- Transport in Malaysia
- Rail transport in Malaysia
- List of expressways and highways in Malaysia
- Malaysian Expressway System
- Malaysian Federal Roads System
- Malaysian State Roads system
- Geography of Malaysia
- List of rivers of Malaysia

== Notes and references ==
- Notes
- Nicolas Janberg. "International Database for Civil and Structural Engineering". Structurae.com.
- Others references
