= Kampung Sungai Ba =

- Location within Borneo
- Coordinates: 1.38333°N 110.7°E
- Country: Malaysia
- State: Sarawak
- Elevation: 16 m (52 ft)

Kampung Sungai Ba is a settlement in Sarawak, Malaysia. It lies approximately 46.5 kilometres (29 mi) east-south-east of the state capital Kuching. Kampung Sungai Ba (Malay: Kampung Sungai Ba) is located in the district, Samarahan Division. The village existed before the time of the Japanese occupation of Sarawak.

Neighbouring settlements include:

- Kampung Sateman 2.6 kilometres (1.6 mi) northwest
- Kampung Jagong 3.7 kilometres (2.3 mi) east
- Kampung Sabang 3.7 kilometres (2.3 mi) north
- Kampung Tegelam 4.1 kilometres (2.5 mi) southwest
- Kampung Sageng 5.6 kilometres (3.5 mi) east
- Kampung Lintang 5.6 kilometres (3.5 mi) east
- Simunjan 5.6 kilometres (3.5 mi) east
- Kampung Lubok Punggor 5.6 kilometres (3.5 mi) south
- Kampung Sungai Jong 5.9 kilometres (3.7 mi) east
- Kampung Panagan 5.9 kilometres (3.7 mi) west
- Kampung Lubok Samsu

2.9 kilometres (1.8 mi) northwest

- Kampung Sungai Alit

2.1 kilometres (1.3 mi) south

- Kampung Tanjung Tanglong

1.0 kilometre (0.6 mi) northeast

- Kampung Sungai Labi

1.7 kilometres (1.1 mi) north

- Kampung Lubok Buntin

4.1 kilometres (2.5 mi) west

- Serias

0.7 kilometres (0.4 mi) south
