= SMK Semera =

- Samarahan, Sarawak; Malaysia

Information
- Type: Government-Aided secondary school
- Motto: Berilmu Beramal Berbakti
- School district: Samarahan
- Principal: Tuan Haji Abang Ismawi Abang Muhi
- Grades: 1-5
- Enrollment: 1584 as in 30 June 2008
- Language: Chinese, Malay, English
- Classrooms: 40
- Colours: Green, Yellow and Black
- Mascot: Swan

Sekolah Menengah Kebangsaan Semera is a five-year comprehensive public secondary school in Semera Village within Asajaya, a small district within Samarahan Division which is in Sarawak, Malaysia. The school is located approximately 10 kilometres southeast of Asajaya.

SMK Semera's students are mainly from Semera, Jemukan, Iboi, Sampun and a few more areas nearby, as part of a sending/receiving relationship with the SMK Asajaya. As of 30 June 2008, the school had an enrolment of 1,584 students.

== Campus ==
SMK Semera consists of several parallel blocks of buildings and a corridor which connects them, and looks like extended "E" from above. Every block has windows on two sides, allowing light to pass through. This was done to save on energy costs, as the school was built during the prelude to the 1973 energy crisis. In 2007 a referendum was passed to add 8 new classrooms, an athletic training area and 2 toilets and to the original facility.

== History ==
The establishment of SMK Semera was suggested by PIBG members, led by Mr. Haji Taha Salleh. Before the construction of the school, students in the community had to attend secondary school in Simunjan. Semera is a village that consists of approximately 400 students.

In 1982, PIBG and the villagers built a seven-room school building, comprising two classrooms, two offices and three teacher's quarters. The school also had to borrow two classes from a primary school - SRK Haji Kelali, Semera. SMK Semera was called SMK Sadong Hilir at that time.

In 1990 the school was moved to a new location behind the village. The name SMK Sadong Hilir was changed to SMK Semera. According to Mr. Zainuddin Kuan, Sarawak Educational Assistant Manager, the name “Semera” meant “at the same time”, for the cholera event that killed hundreds of villagers.
