= Kuching Waterfront =

Waterfront promenade in Kuching, Sarawak, Malaysia

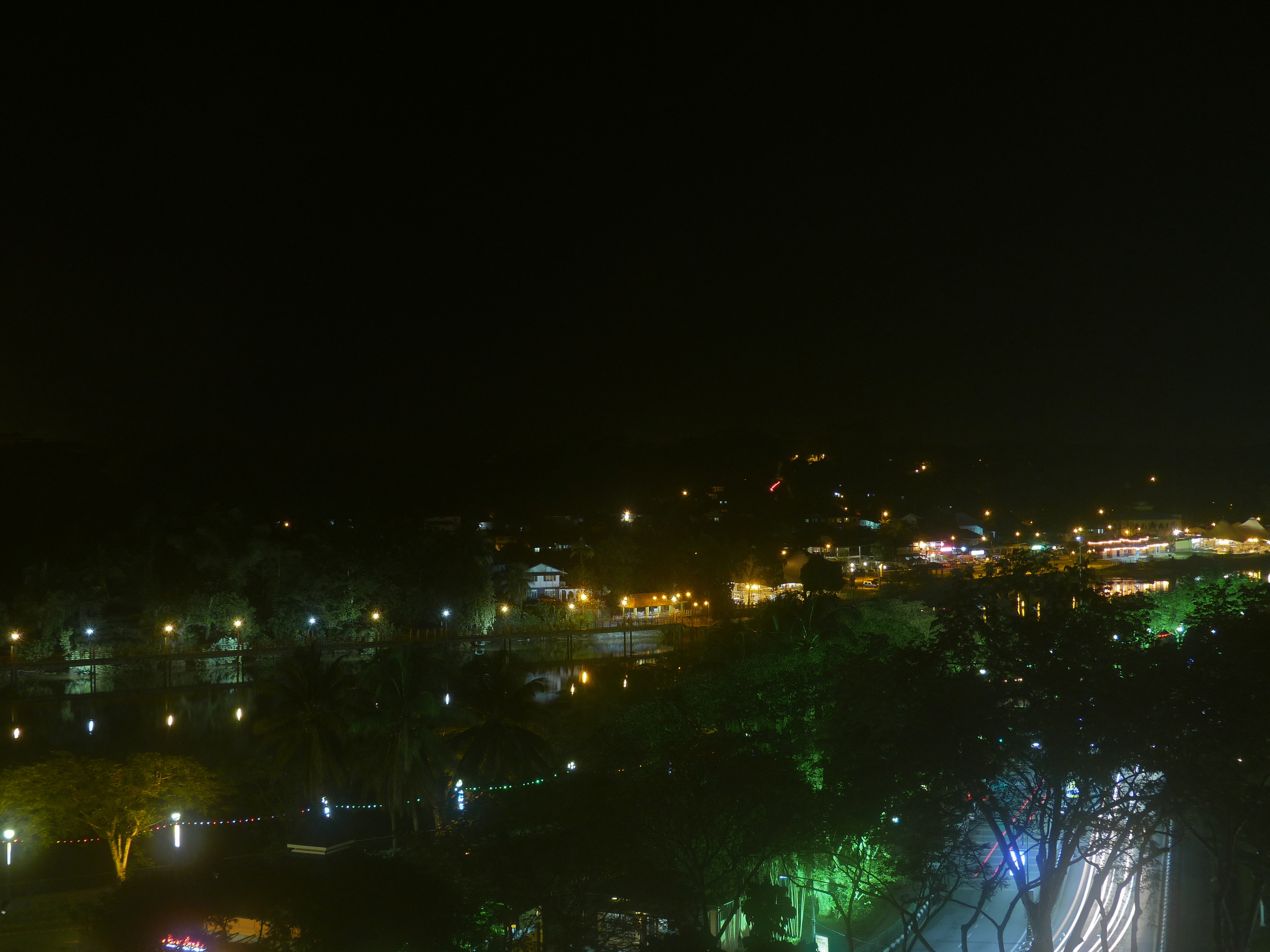
- Kuching Waterfront at night in September 2014.
- Interactive map of Kuching Waterfront
- Native name: Malay: Tebingan Kuching; Arabic: واجهة كوتشينغ البحرية
- Maintained by: Sarawak State Government; Commission of Kuching North City Hall
- Length: 0.1 km (0.062 mi)
- Location: Kuching, Sarawak, Malaysia
- Coordinates: 1.56047°N 110.34313°E

Construction
- Construction start: 1989
- Inauguration: 4 September 1993

The Kuching Waterfront (Malay: Tebingan Kuching; Jawi: واجهة كوتشينغ البحرية), also known as the Kuching Esplanade (Malay: Tebingan Sungai Kuching; Jawi: كوتشينغ إسبلاناد) is a 1 kilometre and 890 metre long waterfront promenade and pedestrian walkway located in Kuching, Sarawak, Malaysia. It is situated along the southern bank of the Sarawak River and has since become the foremost tourist's destination in the state.

== History ==
Kuching Waterfront is a long-cherished project of the then-Sarawak Chief Minister, Abdul Taib Mahmud where he mooted the idea in 1962, a year before Sarawak achieve its independence through Malaysia and 19 years before he become the Sarawak Chief Minister.

The ground work and construction of the waterfront began in 1989 and was led by the Sarawak Economy Development Corporation (SEDC) where a team of experienced architects, engineers and landscape designers was commissioned to build the waterfront: its building costs were a total of RM89 million. Kuching Waterfront was officially opened on 4 September 1993 by Taib and it is the first waterfront to be built in Malaysia.

In 2014, the waterfront was extended to several villages in Sarawak including Kampung Sungai Bedil Besar, Kampung Lintang and Kampung Tanjung to beautify the banks of the Sarawak River. The waterfront underwent transformation process between 2017 and 2019, which involves construction of covered pedestrian areas, addition of LED lighting and renovation of existing landscaping.

In 2023, Kuching Waterfront underwent upgrading project with a total of RM2.5 million of allocation. The project, which ran throughout 2024, intended to "provide a conducive and comfortable environment for visitors".

On 1 August 2025, the Mayor of Kuching North, Datu Hilmy Othman announced that the Kuching Waterfront will be renovated as part of its revitalisation project, which is among initiatives implemented by the Kuching North City Hall (DBKU).

== Landmarks and attractions ==
The Astana and Fort Margherita, built by Charles Brooke in 1870, is visible on the otherside of the Kuching Waterfront. The New Sarawak State Legislative Assembly Building, the current state legislative complex of Sarawak, is situated 550 metres east of the waterfront. The Darul Hana Bridge, which was opened in November 2017, connecting the waterfront on the south bank with the north bank of Kuching.

== Incidents ==
On 1 August 2023, at least 30 to 40 pigeons was found dead at the Kuching Waterfront. The cause of death was initially unclear, with poisoning is not being ruled out as a possibility. The Sarawak Forestry Corporation (SFC) carried out forensic investigation to determined the pigeon's cause of death.

== In the media ==
Kuching Waterfront became the subject matter in 1996 documentary film of the same title, produced by Filem Negara Malaysia.
