= Kampung Dundong =

Kampung Dundong / Lubok Lundang
- Location within Borneo
- Coordinates: 1.386739°N 110.688830°E
- Country: Malaysia
- State: Sarawak
- Elevation: 16 m (52 ft)

Kampung Dundong / Lubok Lundang is a settlement in Sarawak, Malaysia. It lies approximately 46.5 kilometres (29 mi) east-south-east of the state capital Kuching.

Neighbouring settlements include:

- Kampung Sungai Ba

1.5 kilometres (0.9 mi) east

- Kampung Mekar Alam

1.4 kilometres (0.9 mi) east

- Kampung Seteman 2.2 kilometres (1.4 mi) northwest
- Kampung Jagong 4.1 kilometres (2.5 mi) east
- Kampung Sabang 3.2 kilometres (2.0 mi) north
- Kampung Tegelam 4.0 kilometres (2.5 mi) southwest
- Kampung Sageng 5.9 kilometres (3.7 mi) east
- Kampung Lintang 6.0 kilometres (3.7 mi) east
- Simunjan 6.2 kilometres (3.9 mi) east
- Kampung Lubok Punggor 5.4 kilometres (3.4 mi) south
- Kampung Sungai Jong 6.1 kilometres (3.8 mi) east
- Kampung Panagan 5.9 kilometres (3.7 mi) west
- Kampung Lubok Samsu

2.6 kilometres (1.6 mi) northwest

- Kampung Sungai Alit

2.0 kilometres (1.2 mi) south

- Kampung Tanjung Tanglong

1.3 kilometres (0.8 mi) northeast

- Kampung Sungai Labi

1.8 kilometres (1.1 mi) north

- Kampung Lubok Buntin

4.0 kilometres (2.5 mi) west

- Serias

0.8 kilometres (0.5 mi) south
