= Gedong District =

Gedong
- District of Malaysia
- Seal
- Interactive map of Gedong
- Location within Sarawak Location within Malaysia Location within Southeast Asia
- Coordinates: 1°14′42″N 110°41′23″E
- Country: Malaysia
- State: Sarawak
- Division: Samarahan
- Seat: Gedong
- Local area government(s): Gedong District Council

Government
  - District officer: Tamida Da'adi

Area
  - Total: 612 km^{2} (236 sq mi)

Population (2025)
  - Total: 26,173
  - Density: 42.8/km^{2} (111/sq mi)
- Time zone: UTC+8 (MST)
- Postcode: 94700

Gedong is a district under the administration of the Samarahan Division in the state of Sarawak, Malaysia. It is among the newest districts in Sarawak, having been formed in 2022. It is estimated to have a total area of 612 square kilometers and a population of 26,173 people.

== History ==
The Gedong District was originally under the administration of the Simunjan District. The proposal to form Gedong District began in 2020 by the former Gedong assemblyman (ADUN), Mohd Naroden Majais, in collaboration with the then-Simunjan District Officer.

Initially, only the formation of a sub-district was proposed. However, in October 2021, the proposal to establish Gedong as a full district was approved by the State Cabinet. Ultimately, Gedong was gazetted as a full district on March 31, 2022.

On April 12, 2024, the Federal Government, in a Cabinet meeting, agreed to and approved the proposal to establish a district council for Gedong.

== Administration ==
Gedong District is under the administration of the Gedong District Office, which is part of the Samarahan Division administration. The local authority governing this district is the Gedong District Council.

The district comprises 55 villages, which are divided into three zones:

- Ulu Gedong Zone: 27 villages
- Pangkor Zone: 17 villages
- Gedong Proper Zone: 11 villages

=== Politics ===
The Gedong District is placed under the Gedong (N26) State Legislative Assembly constituency, which falls under the Batang Sadong (P200) Parliamentary constituency.

== Geography ==
The Gedong District is located in the west of the state of Sarawak, and in the southern part of the Samarahan Division. It shares borders with the Sebuyau District to the east, the Serian District to the south, the Samarahan District to the northwest, and the Asajaya District and Simunjan District to the north.

The Gedong District has an area of approximately 612 square kilometers. The terrain of this district is entirely flat and level due to its location within a river valley. The main river flowing through the district is the Batang Sadong.

== Facilities ==
The Gedong District has 12 schools, consisting of one national secondary school and the remainder being national primary schools (SK). The district also has two health clinics, a police post, and two public libraries.
