= Fort Margherita =

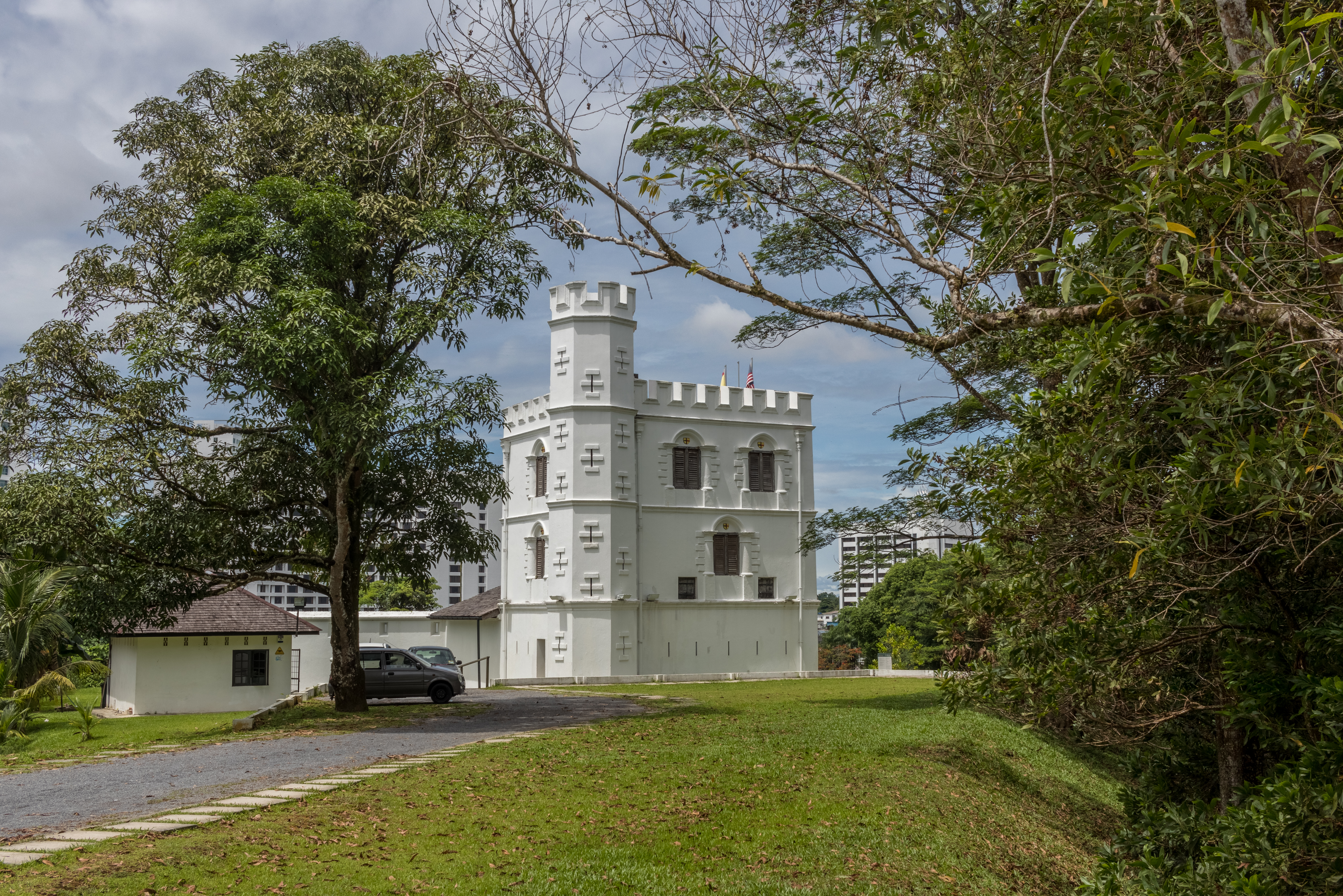
- The main tower of Fort Margherita.
- Interactive map of the Fort Margherita area

General information
- Status: Completed
- Type: Fort
- Location: Kuching, Sarawak, Malaysia
- Coordinates: 1°33′38″N 110°20′58″E
- Construction started: unknown
- Completed: 1879
- Cost: $8,100 Sarawak dollar
- Owner: Government of Sarawak

Technical details
- Floor count: 3

Fort Margherita is a fort constructed in 1879 by Charles Brooke, the second Rajah of Sarawak, situated in Kuching, Sarawak, Malaysia. The fort is an important landmark and monument in Sarawak's history which goes back to the century-old Brooke dynasty of Sarawak. The fort, built in the style of an English castle, was designed to protect Kuching from attacks by pirates. It served as a Police Museum from 1971 before being handed over to the Government of Sarawak and now is a tourist attraction in Kuching. The fort now houses the Brooke Gallery, an exhibition showcasing the history of Sarawak under the Brooke dynasty.

It is situated across the Sarawak River near The Astana, the official residence of the Yang di-Pertua Negeri of Sarawak, and is accessible by road. It is a 15-minute drive along Petra Jaya, or a short river cruise from Pangkalan Batu, in front of Main Bazaar on Kuching Waterfront and located next to the New Sarawak State Legislative Assembly Building. It is part of the Kuching Heritage Trail.

== History ==
Fort Margherita is named after Brooke's beloved wife, Margaret Alice Lili de Windt, whom he married at Highworth, Wiltshire, on 28 October 1869; she was raised to the title of Ranee of Sarawak with the style of Her Highness upon their marriage. The fort was built on a hill overlooking the Sarawak River and situated on the north bank opposite the then fast expanding town centre of Kuching. The fort was well equipped to protect the capital from river-borne invasions.

== Features ==
The three-storey tower block's battlement includes a watchpoint on top, a courtyard surrounded by a high wall with sharp glass shards inlaid for protection, and set into the wall itself are wooden windows from where the cannons were fired. Executions of prisoners were carried out in this courtyard, right up to the Japanese occupation during World War II.

=== The Brooke Gallery ===
In 2016, The Brooke Gallery, which showcases belongings from the Brooke family and artefacts during their time as the White Rajahs, was opened. The gallery is a collaboration between the State Museum Department, Tourism Cultural and Heritage Sarawak and the Brooke Trust. The opening of the gallery received support from volunteers from Sarawak, the United Kingdom and Australia.

== See also ==
- List of Forts constructed during the Raj of Sarawak
