= Indian Mosque, Kuching =

Mosque in Kuching, Sarawak, Malaysia

- Masjid India, Kuching
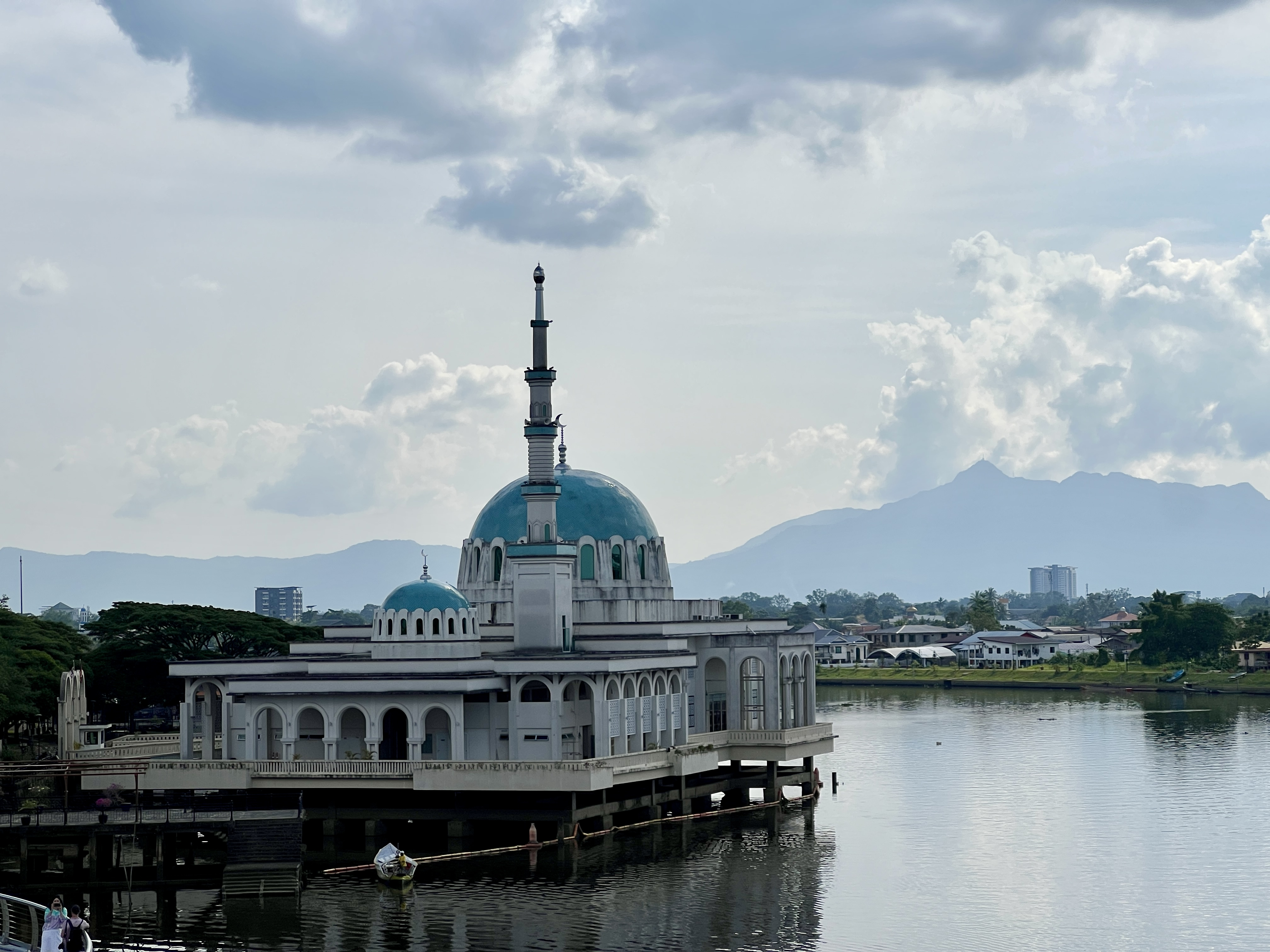

- Location within Sarawak

Religion
- Affiliation: Islam
- Branch/tradition: Sunni

Location
- Location: Kuching, Sarawak, Malaysia
- Interactive map of Indian Mosque, Kuching
- Coordinates: 1°33′39.85″N 110°20′38.99″E

Architecture
- Type: mosque
- Minaret: 1

Indian Mosque or Floating Mosque is a floating mosque located at the bank of Sarawak River, Kuching, Sarawak, Malaysia. The building is officiated by the former Yang di-Pertua Negeri of Sarawak, Abdul Taib Mahmud at 1 March 2019.

== History ==
The former mosque building was constructed in December 1871 by a group of Indian Muslims. It was built on land purchased from the government under Charles Brooke's administration for 60 Sarawak Dollars. The land was located in what was then a centre of Indian Muslim commerce, in the area now known as Gambir Street and India Street in Kuching. This old building is still standing between textile and spices shop on the Gambir Street and locally known as Masjid Tambi. Four important individuals, Messrs Thamby Abdullah, Kather Maideen, Kader Basah and Said Mohamed, were the pioneers in implementing the mosque's upgrading work.

The construction project of the floating mosque to replace the former one began on 2016. The building cost of MYR 21 million to build, and is able to accommodate 1,600 worshipper at once.
