= Darul Hana Bridge =

Bridge in Kuching, Sarawak, Malaysia

Darul Hana Bridge: Jambatan Darul Hana; جسر دار الحناء
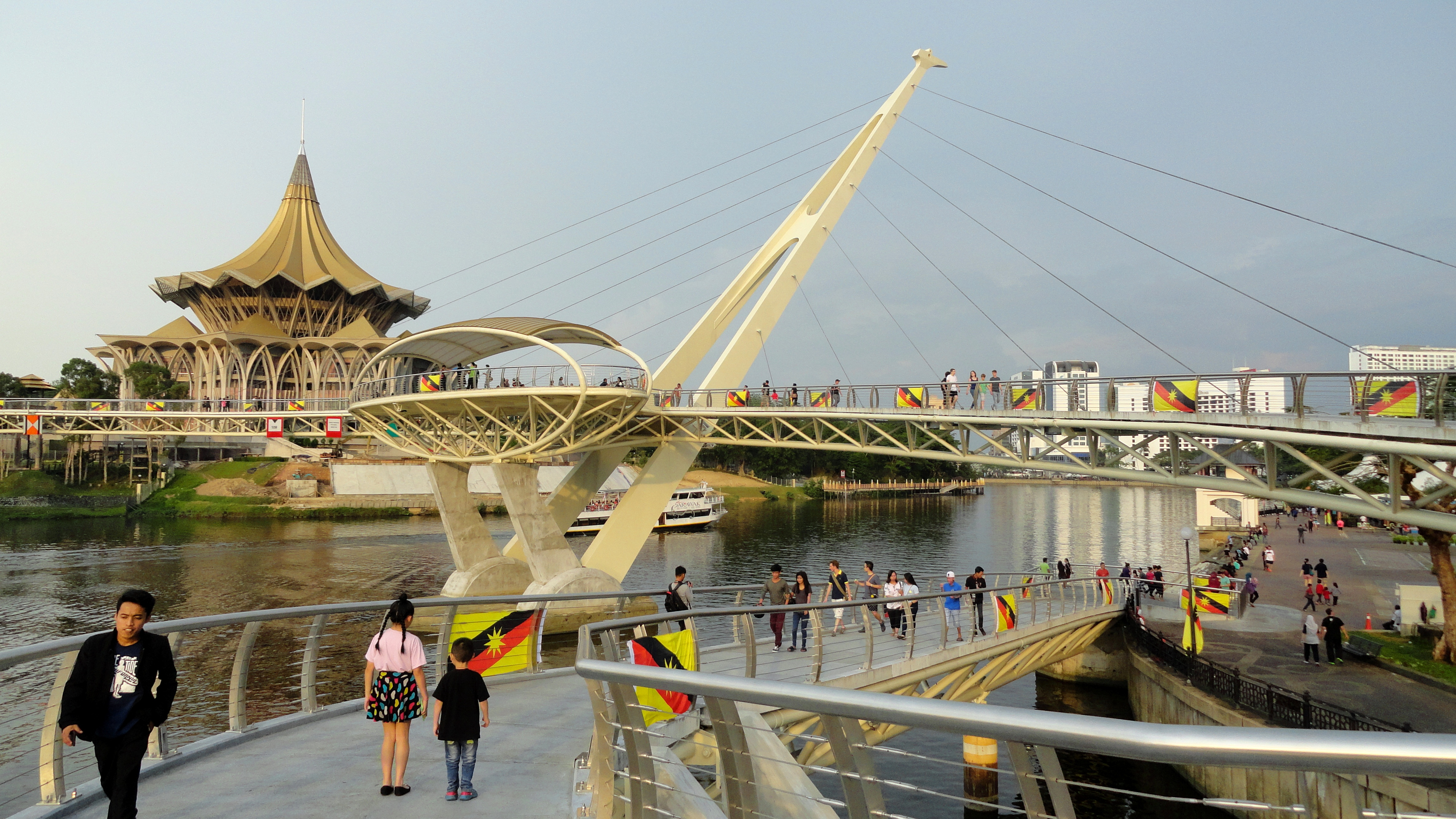
- Coordinates: 1°33′41″N 110°20′46″E
- Carries: Pedestrians
- Crosses: Sarawak River
- Locale: North and south Kuching
- Maintained by: Sarawak Economic Development Corporation (SEDC)

Characteristics
- Design: Footbridge
- Total length: 276 m
- Width: 32.5 m
- Height: 1.62 m (5 ft 4 in)
- Longest span: 133 m

History
- Designer: KTA (Sarawak) Sdn Bhd
- Constructed by: PPES Works (Sarawak) Sdn Bhd
- Opened: 11 November 2017

Location
- Interactive map of Darul Hana Bridge

The Darul Hana Bridge (Malay: Jambatan Darul Hana; Jawi: جسر دار الحناء) is a pedestrian bridge in Kuching, Sarawak, situated near the Kuching Waterfront and crosses the mouth of Sarawak River. It is the only pedestrian bridge that connects both north and south of Kuching, the state's capital city.

== Overview ==
The idea to build the Darul Hana Bridge was first proposed by Abdul Taib Mahmud in 2013 while he was still the Chief Minister of Sarawak. It was tentatively to be named the Golden Bridge. Before the construction began, the Golden Bridge sparked controversy when some of the boatmen, collectively known as Pak Tambang, express their concerns that the bridge would disrupt their activities.

The Sarawak Economic Development Corporation (SEDC) was commissioned to implemented the project, while PPES Works (Sarawak) and Naim Land was entrusted as the construction contractor in a joint venture. Construction began with its exact date is undisclosed at cost of RM35 million and built near where the last British Governor, Sir Alexander Waddell crossed the Sarawak River from the Astana to the opposite bank, on the last days of British administration in Sarawak. Construction was completed in June 2017 with the deck's last steel segment was lifted in place.

== Design and specification ==
Darul Hana Bridge's design was inspired by yin and yang concept. Its distinctive ‘S’-shape also resembles the letter "S", which stands for Sarawak. The bridge has a 335-metre-long floor, supported by two 45-metre-high cables from a steel tower with a 48-degree inclination spanning the Sarawak River. Its design, complete with two observation decks resembling the hornbill-inspired structures of traditional Bidayuh bamboo bridges, was the brainchild of KTA (Sarawak) with the final touches, equipped with an LED lighting system.

== Opening ==
The bridge was officially opened to public on 11 November 2017 and officiated by the Yang di-Pertua Negeri of Sarawak, Abdul Taib Mahmud. Darul Hana is an Arabic term which means 'a peaceful and tranquility place or residential area' and it was chosen by Taib as the name of the bridge. During the bridge's launching, he described the bridge as "the symbol of Sarawak", while stated it is a "heritage trail to those who come here".

== Gallery ==
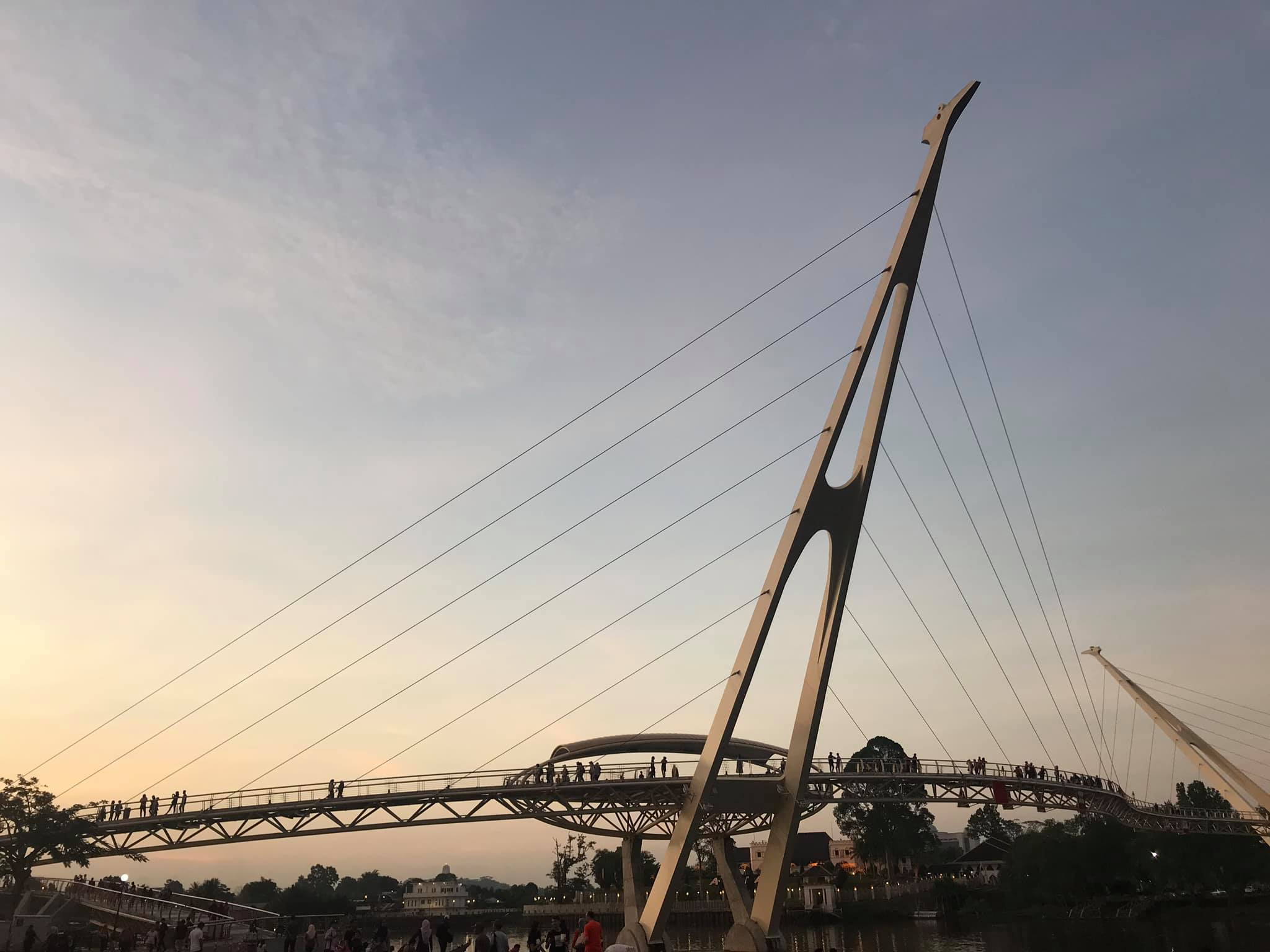
Darul Hana Bridge at dusk, with The Astana seen visible below

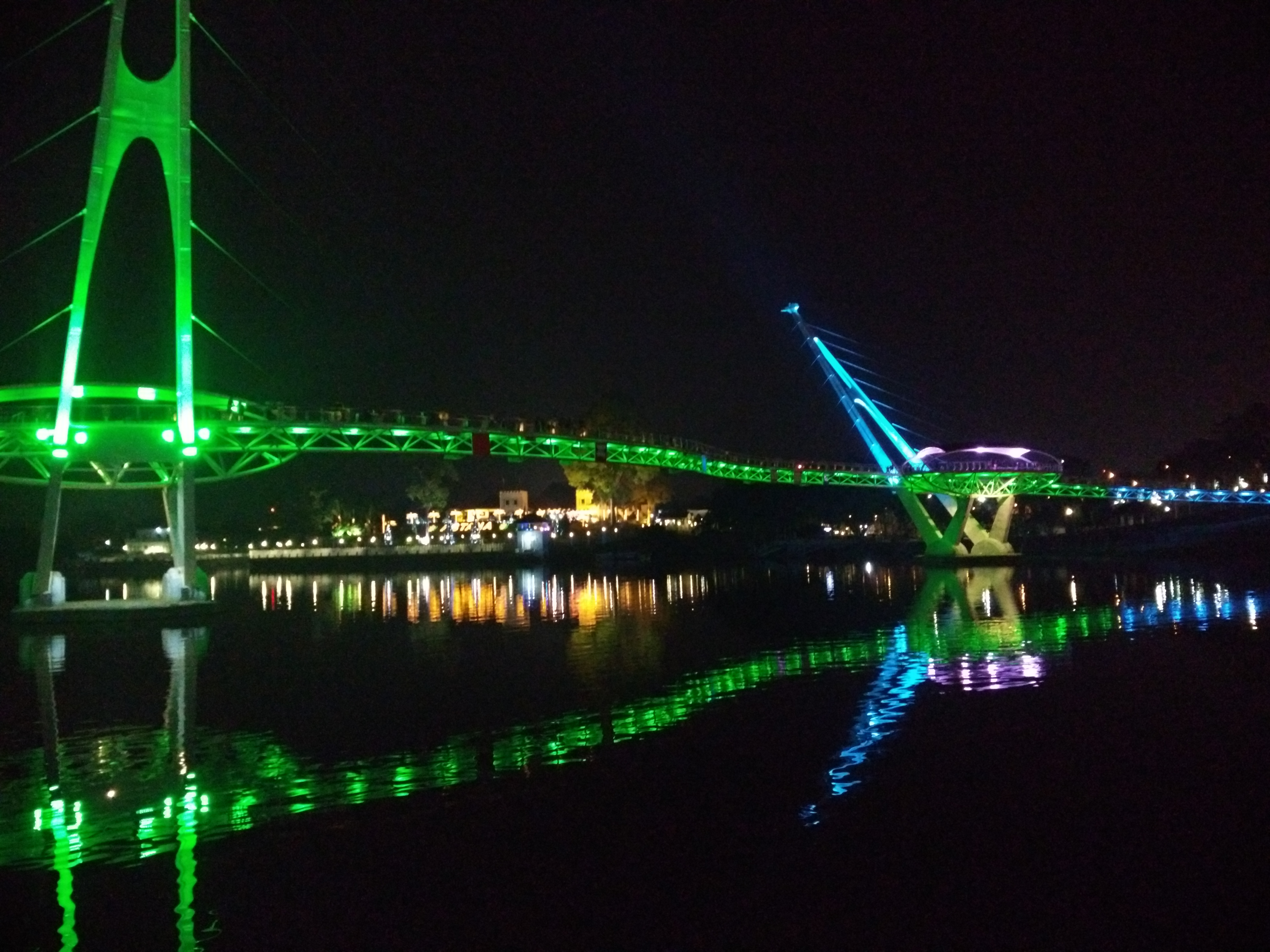
The bridge at night, decorated with colourful LED lights

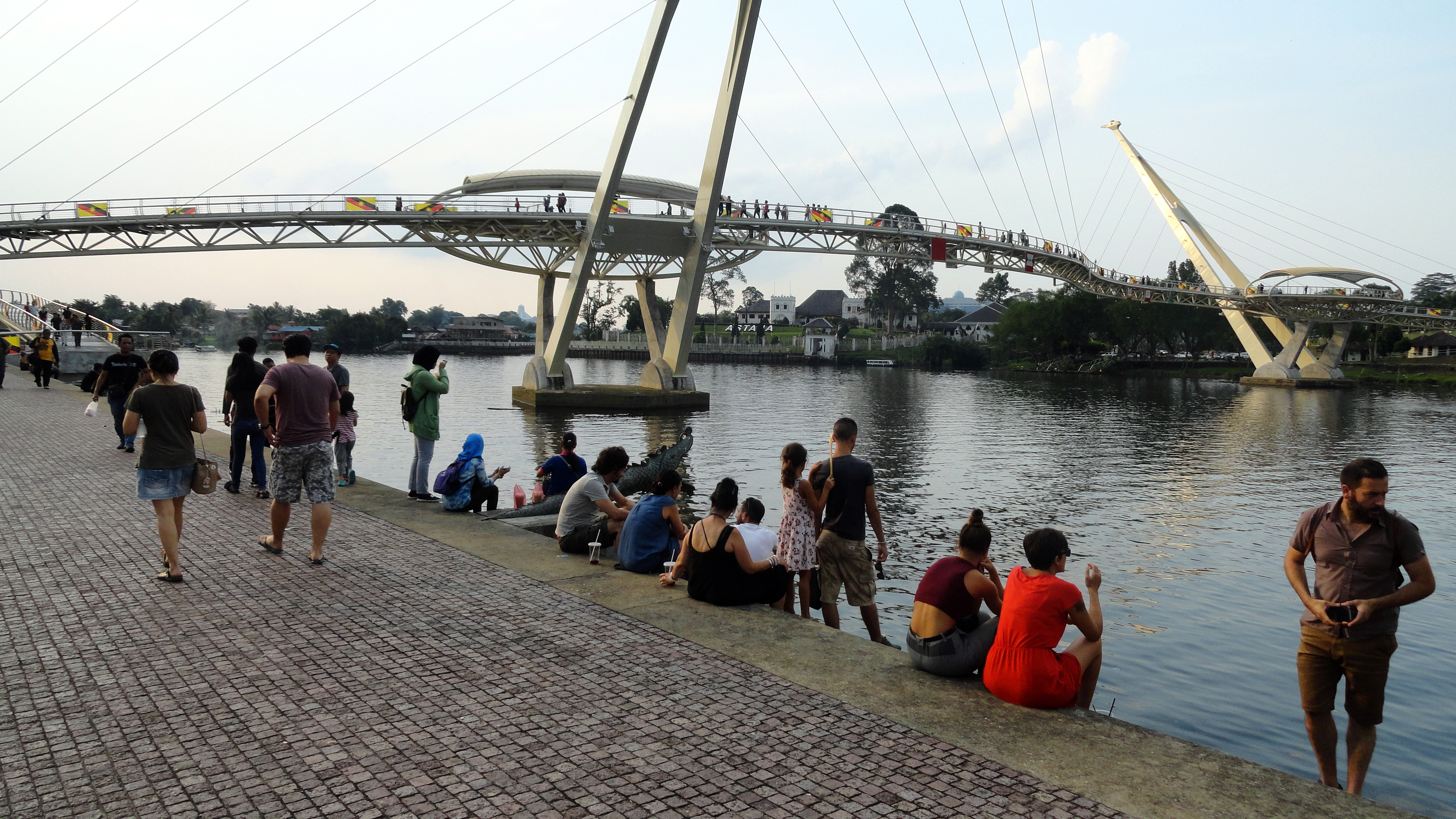
Kuching Waterfront, where the bridge was seen during the broad daylight

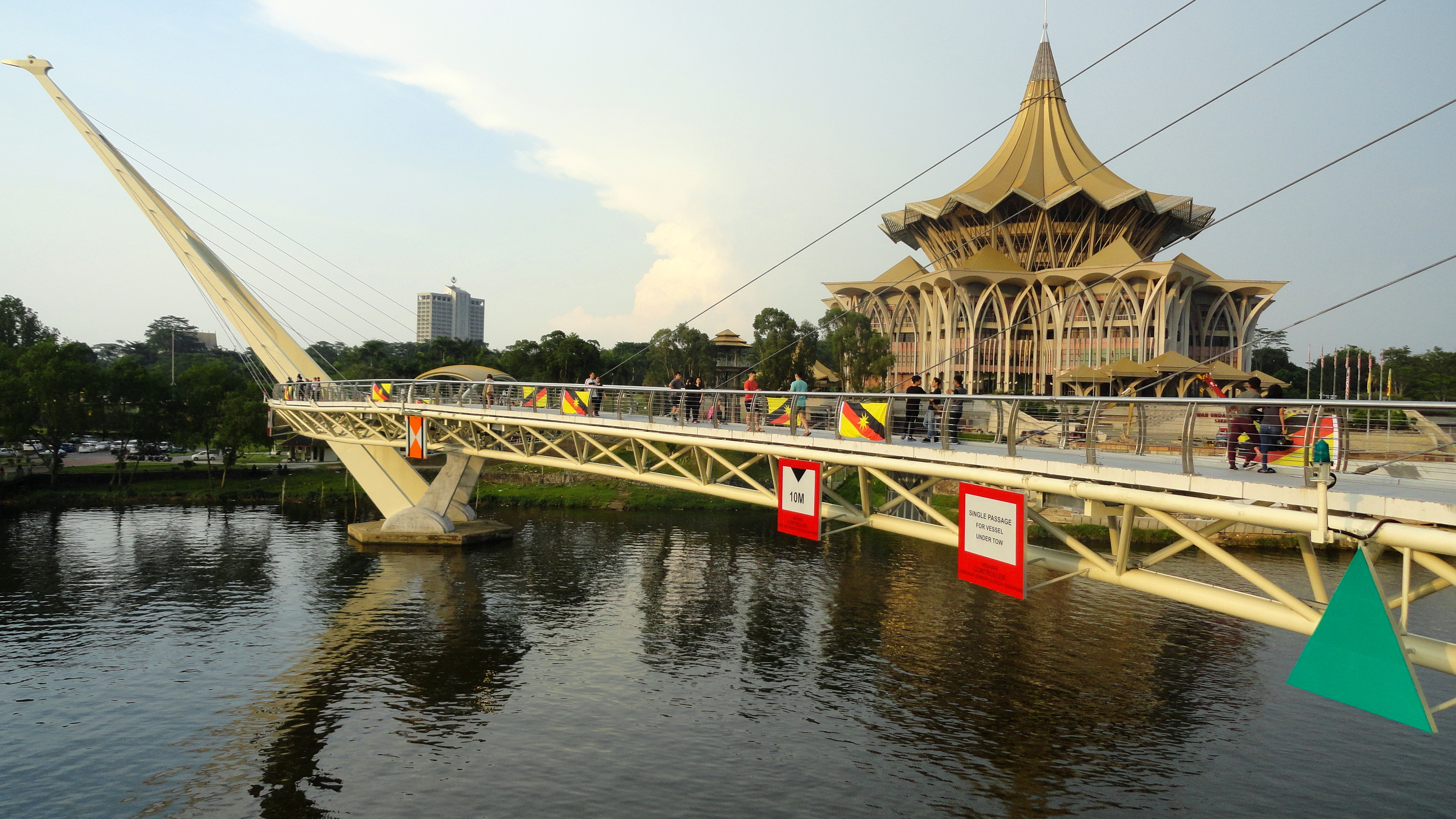
The New Sarawak State Legislative Assembly Building seen visible from the Darul Hana Bridge

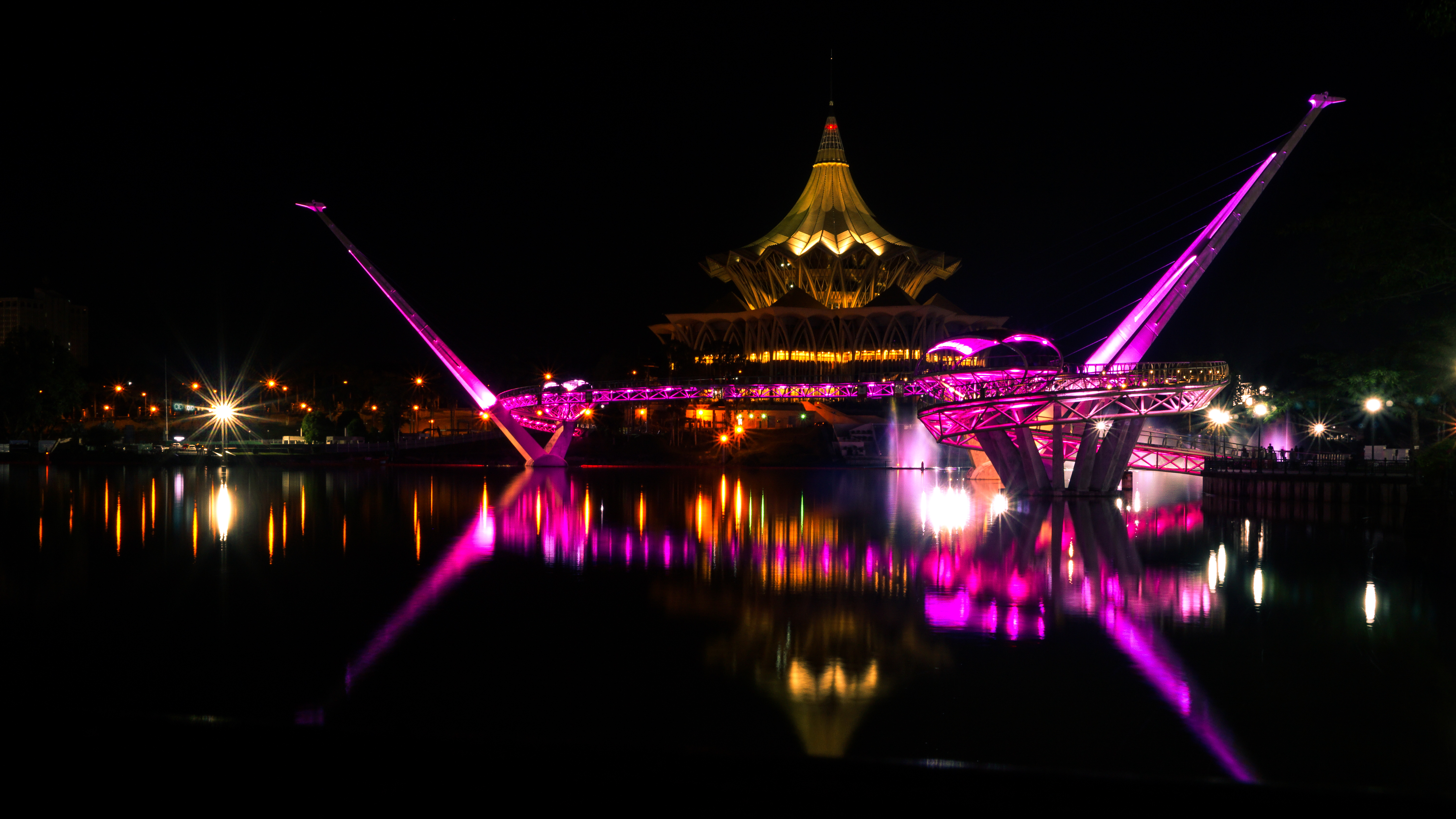
Night lights at the bridge

== See also ==
- List of bridges in Malaysia
