= Sungai Damit RM17 Million Crooked Bridge =

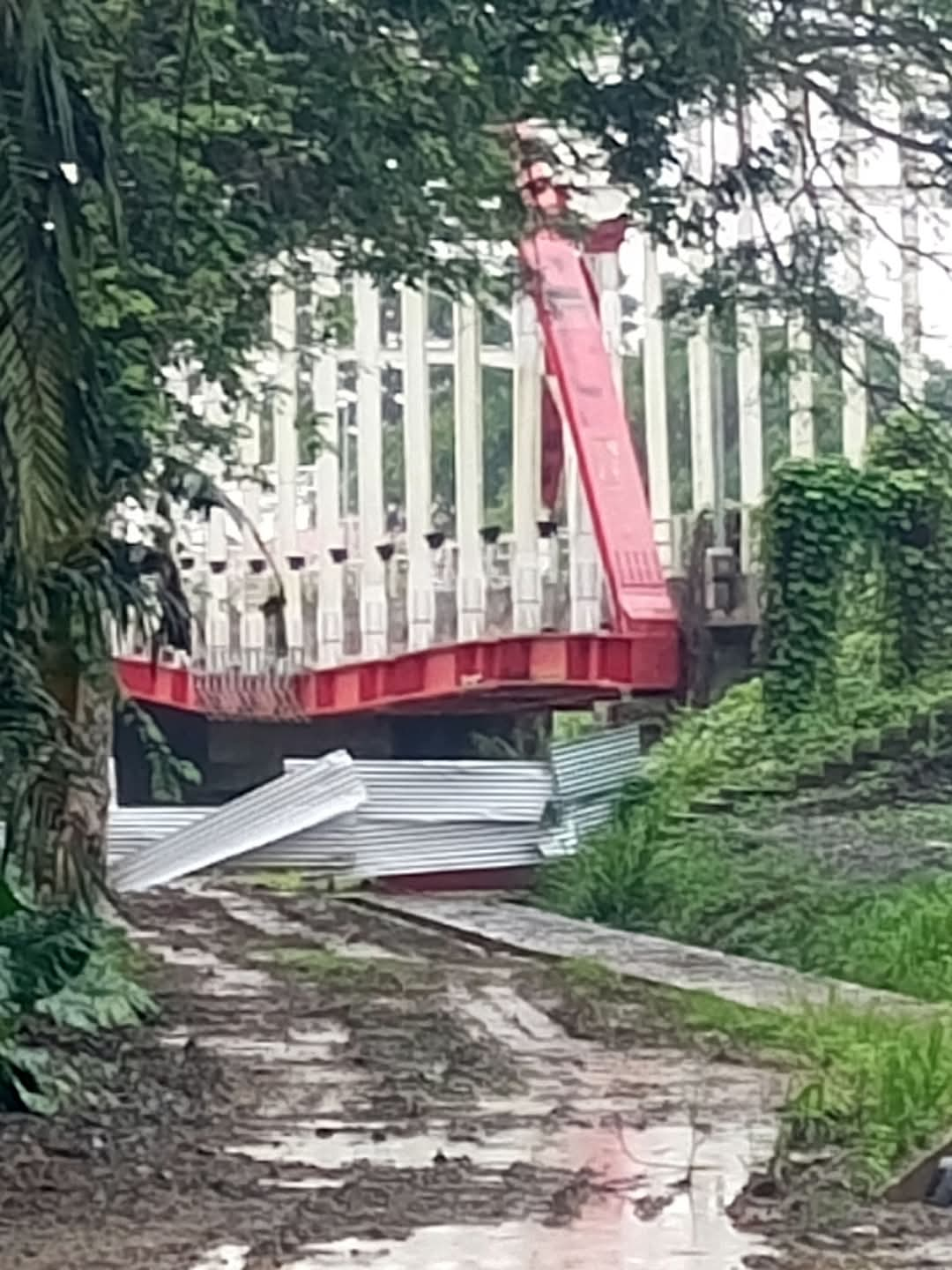
- The bridge in February 2025
- Coordinates: 6°10′32″N 116°14′15″E
- Carries: Vehicles, pedestrians
- Crosses: Sungai Damit River
- Locale: Tamparuli, Sabah, Malaysia
- Begins: Tuaran
- Ends: Sungai Damit
- Official name: Tuaran–Sungai Damit Bridge
- Other name: Jambatan Sungai Damit Bengkok Bridge

Characteristics
- Design: Arch-tied with rigid hangers
- Material: Steel; concrete
- Total length: 104 m (341 ft)
- Width: 14 m (46 ft)
- Height: 28 m (92 ft)
- Traversable?: yes
- No. of lanes: 2
- Capacity: 500 vehicles

History
- Construction start: 2018
- Construction cost: RM17,000,000 (2021); c. RM30 million (rebuild)
- Opened: 2022 (unofficial use)
- Rebuilt: 2025 (commenced)
- Closed: 2023 (structural defects); 2025 (rebuild)

Location
- Interactive map of Sungai Damit RM17 Million Crooked Bridge

The Sungai Damit RM17 Million Crooked Bridge, officially the Tuaran–Sungai Damit Bridge, and also known as the Jambatan Sungai Damit Bengkok Bridge, is an arch-tied bridge located in Sungai Damit, Tamparuli, Sabah, Malaysia. The bridge became controversial due to severe structural defects, crooked or bent in the middle span on its own weight, raising concerns over public safety and allegations of possible fund misappropriation in its construction.

== History ==
As part of an infrastructure project in the area designed to improve local accessibility, budget allocation for the Sungai Damit Crooked Bridge was approved in 2017; construction commenced in 2018; and was completed in 2022 at a cost of RM17,000,000. Soon after its completion it was found, in 2022, to have developed a significant bend, raising questions about construction quality and safety. The bridge was unofficially opened to use; however officially closed in 2023, after defects gained publicity.

A similar bridge connects Tamparuli and Tuaran, also across the Sungai Damit River.

== Controversy ==
In February 2025, Zid Aliasgar exposed the condition of the bridge through a video on his TikTok account. The video went viral with 1.3 million views, sparking debates on several key issues:

- Public safety – the bridge’s unusual bending raised fears over its stability.
- Construction cost – the RM17 million cost was considered excessively high compared to the bridge’s physical state, which some estimated to be worth only around RM500,000.
- Allegations of misappropriation – there were speculations that the project’s funds might have been misused or handled non-transparently.

=== Aftermath ===
Following media exposure, the bridge was closed to the public to prevent potential accidents. An additional RM30 million was allocated by the government to dismantle and construct a new replacement bridge. Zid Aliasgar continued to demand an investigation into the original RM17 million allocation, believing that there may have been financial mismanagement or corruption in the project.

The Sungai Damit RM17 Million Crooked Bridge controversy sparked a larger discussion on transparency in government infrastructure projects in Sabah. The timing of video evidence of 18 other corruption cases in the state, is so timely. But no action had been taken by the authorities. The revelation attracted significant public and media attention, increasing pressure on authorities to investigate potential misconduct in infrastructure projects across the region.

In 2023, there were calls that the crooked bridge be retained for tourism purposes; and a new bridge be built adjacent to the defective bridge.

== See also ==
- Corruption in Malaysia
- List of bridges in Malaysia
