= Batang Samarahan Bridge =

Batang Samarahan Bridge Jambatan Batang Samarahan
- Coordinates: 1.50081°N 110.49922°E
- Carries: Motor vehicles
- Crosses: Samarahan/Sabang River
- Locale: Federal Route 8301 Jalan Kota Samarahan-Sadong Jaya
- Official name: Batang Samarahan Bridge
- Maintained by: Sarawak Public Works Department (JKR) Samarahan Division

Characteristics
- Design: Arch box girder bridge
- Total length: 774 m

History
- Designer: State Government of Sarawak; Sarawak Public Works Department (JKR); Pekerjaan Piasau Konkerit Sdn Bhd
- Constructed by: Pekerjaan Piasau Konkerit Sdn Bhd
- Opened: 8 June 2018

Location
- Interactive map of Batang Samarahan Bridge

Batang Samarahan Bridge (Malay: Jambatan Batang Samarahan) is a bridge connecting Kota Samarahan and Asajaya in Sarawak, Malaysia. The 774 m (2,539 ft) bridge replaced the ferry service across Batang Samarahan/Sabang river.

The bridge opened for a trial run in May 2018, before opening permanently in June 2018.
