= Beladin =

- Location within Borneo
- Coordinates: 1°38′N 111°12′E
- Country: Malaysia
- State: Sarawak

Beladin is a small town in Betong Division, Sarawak, Malaysia. Like Maludam and Pusa, Beladin is also made up of a few Malay fishing villages.

The state constituency formerly represented in the Sarawak State Legislative Assembly (1991–96) was Beladin (state constituency).
