= Kampung Jagong =

- Location within Borneo
- Coordinates: 1.38333°N 110.73333°E
- Country: Malaysia
- State: Sarawak
- Administrative Division: Simunjan
- Elevation: 16 m (52 ft)

Kampung Jagong is a settlement in the Simunjan division of Sarawak, Malaysia. It lies approximately 49.8 kilometres (31 mi) east-south-east of the state capital Kuching.

Neighbouring settlements include:

- Kampung Sageng 1.9 kilometres (1.2 mi) east
- Simunjan 1.9 kilometres (1.2 mi) east
- Kampung Lintang 1.9 kilometres (1.2 mi) east
- Kampung Sungai Jong 2.6 kilometres (1.6 mi) southeast
- Kampung Dundong 3.7 kilometres (2.3 mi) west
- Kampung Segunduk 4.1 kilometres (2.5 mi) southeast
- Kampung Sabang 5.2 kilometres (3.2 mi) northwest
- Kampung Lobang Empat 5.9 kilometres (3.7 mi) east
- Kampung Seteman 5.9 kilometres (3.7 mi) west
- Kampung Tegelam 6.7 kilometres (4.2 mi) southwest
