= Kampung Sabang =

- Location within Borneo
- Coordinates: 1.41667°N 110.7°E
- Country: Malaysia
- State: Sarawak
- Administrative Division: Simunjan
- Elevation: 14 m (46 ft)

Kampung Sabang is a settlement in the Simunjan division of Sarawak, Malaysia. It lies approximately 44.8 kilometres (28 mi) east-south-east of the state capital Kuching.

Neighbouring settlements include:

- Kampung Seteman 2.6 kilometres (1.6 mi) southwest
- Kampung Dundong 3.7 kilometres (2.3 mi) south
- Kampung Perin 4.1 kilometres (2.5 mi) northwest
- Kampung Buloh 4.1 kilometres (2.5 mi) northwest
- Kampung Jagong 5.2 kilometres (3.2 mi) southeast
- Kampung Panagan 5.9 kilometres (3.7 mi) west
- Kampung Terasi 5.9 kilometres (3.7 mi) north
- Simunjan 6.7 kilometres (4.2 mi) southeast
