= Sarawak Regatta =

Annual paddling event

The Sarawak Regatta is an annual paddling event held on the Sarawak River in Kuching, Malaysia.

== History ==
The Regatta traces its origins to the era of James Brooke since 1872 who instituted the use of boat races to settle conflicts between tribes in Sarawak. During that time, "The Rajah's Cup" and "The Champion Cup" offered the highest monetary rewards to boat race participants.

== Events ==
=== Current events ===
The following events were offered at the 2010 regatta:

- Balok Boat
  - 7 paddlers (men)
- Bidar Boat
  - Bidar 15 Paddlers Mixed (8 Men + 7 Women)
  - Bidar 20 Paddlers Men (Government Agency & Corporate)
  - Bidar 10 Paddlers Women
  - Bidar 15 Paddlers Men
  - Bidar 20 Paddlers - Inter Division
  - Bidar 30 Paddlers - Hotel/Travel Agency (Open) (25 Men + 5 Women) - Malaysia Tourism Promotion Board Challenge Trophy
  - Bidar 20 Paddlers Men - TELEKOM Malaysia Challenge Trophy
  - Bidar 30 Paddlers Men - VIP (Group A)-Cahya Mata Sarawak Challenge Trophy
  - Bidar 30 Paddlers Men - VIP (Group B)-Resident Office of Kuching Challenge Trophy
  - Bidar 30 Paddlers Men - TYT (Tuan Yang Terutama Negeri Sarawak) Challenge Trophy
- Kenyalang Boat
  - 15 Paddlers - Tourists
  - 20 Paddlers - International (Open)
  - 20 Paddlers Men (Inter IPTA/IPTS/IP)
- Tambang Boat
  - Motorised
  - Non-Motorised
