= Padungan River =

River in Sarawak, Malaysia

The Padungan River (Malay: Sungai Padungan) is a river in Sarawak, Malaysia. It is a tributary to the Sarawak River, and flows through Kuching, the capital and the most populous city in the state of Sarawak.
