= Sibu-Tanjung Manis Highway =

Route information
- Length: 80 km (50 mi)

Major junctions
- From: Sibu
- To: Tanjung Manis District

Location
- Country: Malaysia

Highway system
- Highways in Malaysia; Expressways; Federal; State

Sibu-Tanjung Manis Highway, Sarawak State Route Q743, is a major highway in Sibu Division, Sarawak, Malaysia. The highway was expected to be completed by the end of June 2010, and as of March 2011, the highway was accessible, although there were several sections still under construction.

== List of interchanges ==
Km	Exit	Interchange	To	Remarks
		Sibu		
		Igan Bridge; Batang Igan		Starting point of the Highway
		Lebaan Bridge; Batang Lebaan		
		Lengan Bridge; Sungai Lengan		
		Setubah Bridge; Loba Setubah		
		Serdeng Bridge; Sungai Serdeng		
		Loba Pulau Bridge; Sungai Loba Pulau		
		Belawai Bridge; Sungai Belawai		
		Tanjung Manis		
