= Seri Gemilang Bridge =

Bridge in Putrajaya, Malaysia

Seri Gemilang Bridge Jambatan Seri Gemilang
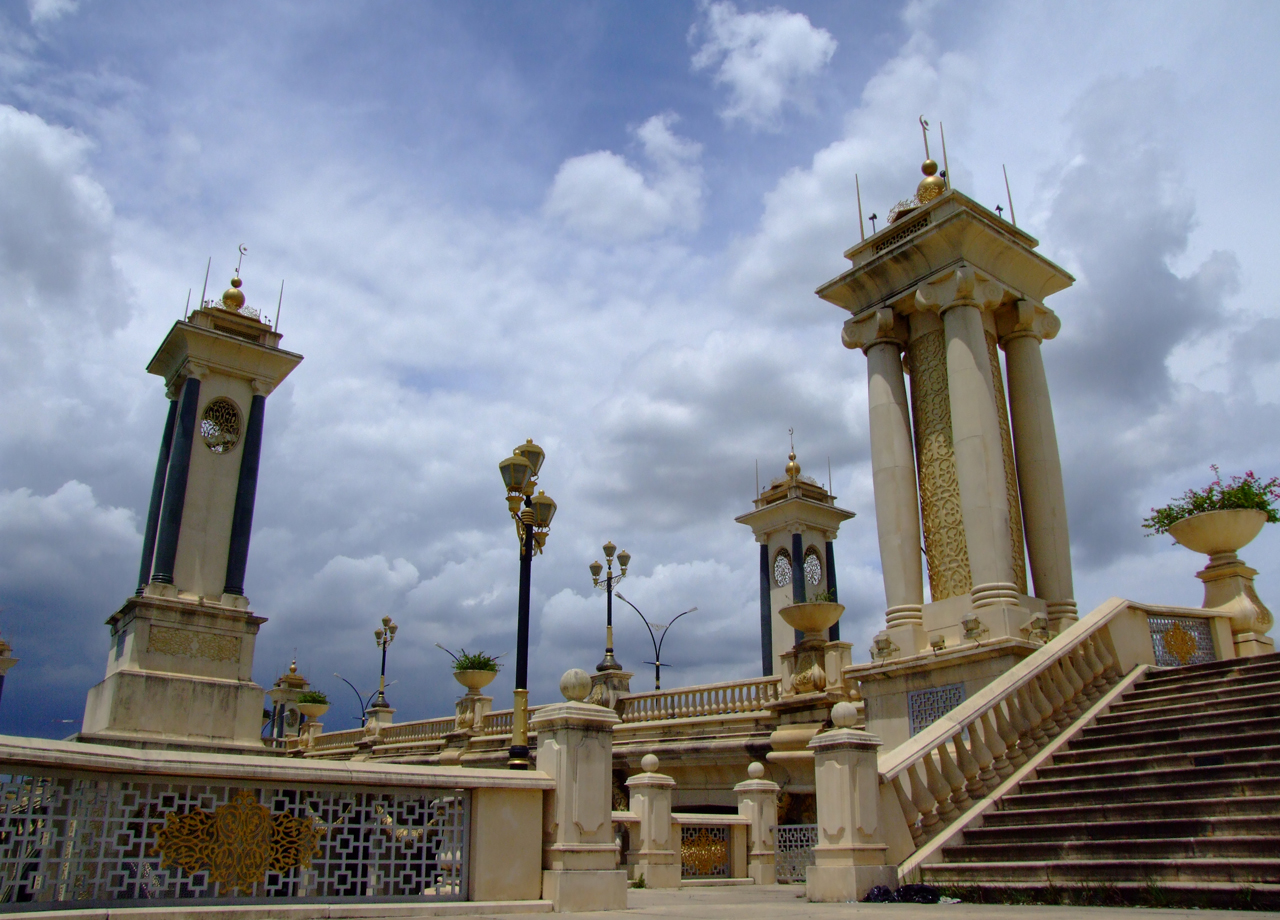
- Coordinates: 2°54′0.2″N 101°40′44.8″E
- Carries: Motor vehicles, Pedestrians
- Crosses: Putrajaya Lake
- Locale: Lebuh Seri Gemilang
- Official name: Seri Gemilang Bridge
- Maintained by: Perbadanan Putrajaya

Characteristics
- Design: arch bridge
- Total length: 240 m
- Width: 3.5 m
- Longest span: 120 m

History
- Designer: PJSI
- Constructed by: Perbadanan Putrajaya
- Opened: 2003

Location
- Interactive map of Seri Gemilang Bridge

Seri Gemilang Bridge is a ceremonial bridge in Putrajaya, Malaysia. It connects Heritage Square with Putrajaya Convention Centre.

The bridge has a main span 120 metres (394 ft) long, with a 60-metre (197 ft) span at each end, for a total length of 240 metres (787 ft). There are six traffic lanes, each 3.5 metres (11.5 ft) wide. The deck level above the water is 36.75 metres (121 ft) at the centre of the bridge.

The road from the bridge leads to the Putrajaya International Convention Centre at the end.
