= New Sarawak State Legislative Assembly Building =

Meeting place of the Sarawak State Legislative Assembly in Kuching, Malaysia

New Sarawak Legislative Assembly Building
- Bangunan Dewan Undangan Sarawak Baru
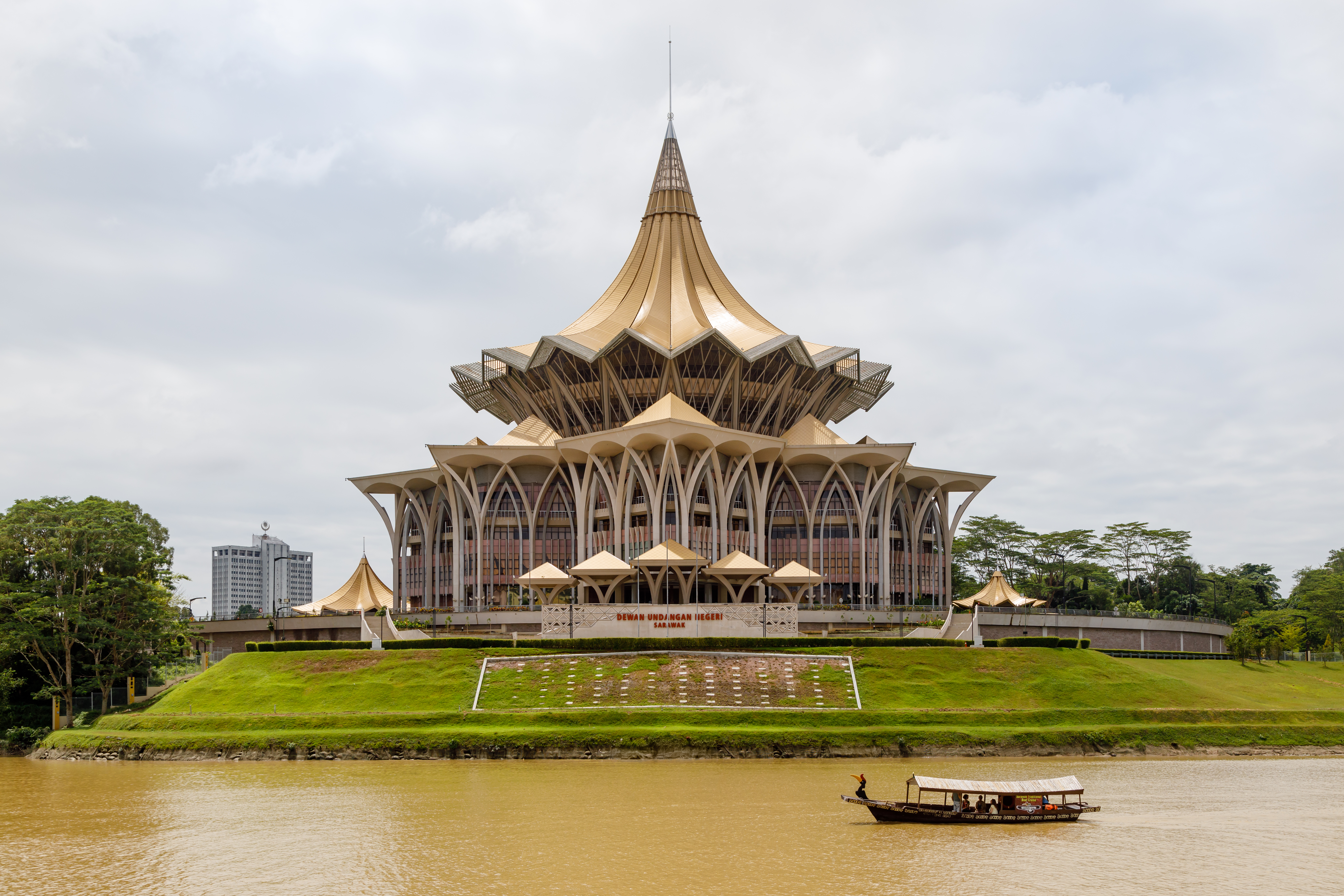
- Interactive map of the New Sarawak Legislative Assembly Building area

General information
- Status: Completed
- Type: State Legislative Assembly
- Location: Kuching, Sarawak, Malaysia
- Coordinates: 1°33′42″N 110°20′52″E
- Construction started: September 2004
- Completed: 31 May 2009
- Opening: 27 July 2009
- Cost: RM 296.5 million
- Owner: Sarawak State Government

Height
- Tip: 115 m (377 ft)
- Roof: 114 m (374 ft)

Technical details
- Floor count: 9
- Lifts/elevators: Unknown

Design and construction
- Architecture firm: Hijjas Kasturi Associates Aki Media
- Developer: Bina Puri Holdings Bhd; PPES Works (Sarawak) Sdn Bhd; Naim Cendera Sdn Bhd

The New Sarawak Legislative Assembly Building (Malay: Bangunan Dewan Undangan Sarawak Baru) is the current state legislative complex of Sarawak, in Kuching, Malaysia. It houses the Sarawak Legislative Assembly, where state assemblymen from all over Sarawak meet and preside over debates and passing of laws.

The complex is at the north bank of the Sarawak River in between The Astana, which is the official residence of the Yang di-Pertua Negeri (Governor) of Sarawak, and Fort Margherita.

The building was officially opened by the Yang di-Pertuan Agong (King) of Malaysia, Tuanku Mizan Zainal Abidin of Terengganu, on 27 July 2009, followed by the Rulers' Conference in the building complex.

== History ==
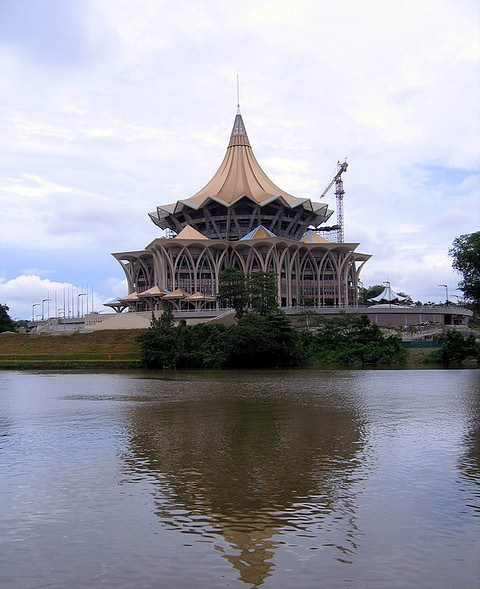
State assembly building under construction in November 2008.

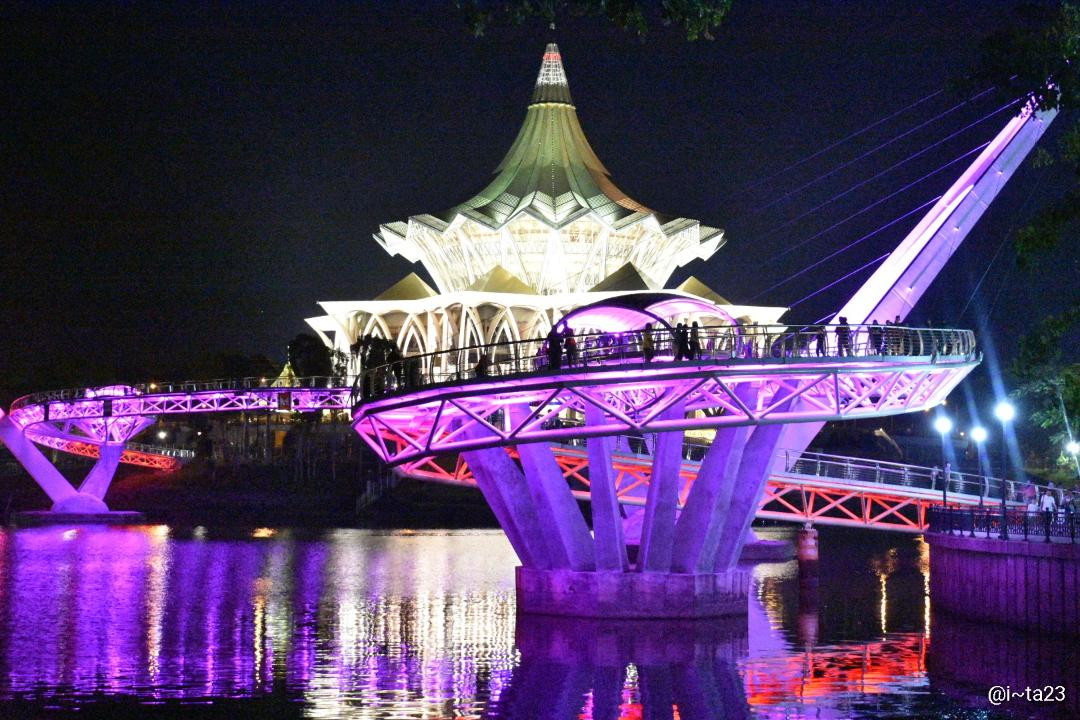
The state assembly building along with newly opened Darul Hana Bridge at night.

The groundbreaking ceremony of the building was held in September 2004. The main project developers were Naim Cendera and PPES Works. The building was handed over to the Sarawak government in May 2009. The building cost RM 296.5 million to build.

The opening ceremony of the building was held in July 2009 with a river float parade, fireworks, and the purchase of luxury cars which will be used by respective state government departments. The ceremony was attended by the King of Malaysia and broadcast live nationwide.

The Sarawak government added the Darul Hana bridge across the Sarawak river near the building in 2017. In 2018, the Darul Hana musical fountain was added in front of the state assembly building. A 99-metre-tall flagpole was also added to the site in 2023 to commemorate the 60th year anniversary of Sarawak's position as a founding partner in the formation of Malaysia.

== Architecture ==
The building has nine floors with a height of 114 metres, diameter of 30.9 metres, and an area of 760 square metres. The speaker of the state assembly, Dato Sri Mohd Asfia Awang Nassar, said that the building would last for 100 years. The building design takes the shape of baruk, a traditional Bidayuh communal round-shaped house. The cross-section of the building is designed like a nine-pointed star. The building is capped with a roof design similar to a Malaysian royal umbrella (payung negara in Malay).

The public viewing gallery is located on the ninth floor. The Sarawak state legislative assembly is located on the eighth floor. The state assembly members lounge is located on the 7th floor. Meanwhile, the lower floors house offices for the state assembly members, function halls, meeting rooms, an auditorium, and a surau. The state legislative assembly chamber can hold up to 108 members, each with their own office. It also has 142 seats for civil servants, a ceremonial hall accommodating 300 people, banquet hall with a capacity of 1,000 people, a car park for 315 vehicles, and a parade ground.

== See also ==
- The Astana, Sarawak
- Sarawak State Legislative Assembly
- Wisma Bapa Malaysia
