= Lebaan Bridge =

Lebaan Bridge Jambatan Lebaan
- Carries: Motor vehicles
- Crosses: Lebaan River
- Locale: Sibu-Tanjung Manis Highway
- Official name: Lebaan Bridge
- Maintained by: Sarawak Public Works Department (JKR) Sibu Division

Characteristics
- Design: Arch box girder bridge
- Total length: 1.24 km

History
- Designer: State Government of Sarawak; Sarawak Public Works Department (JKR); Trans Resources Corporation Sdn Bhd (TRC)
- Constructed by: Shin Yang Sdn Bhd

Lebaan Bridge (Malay: Jambatan Lebaan) or Batang Lebaan Bridge is a major bridge connecting Sibu and Tanjung Manis in Sarawak, Malaysia. Once completed, the 1.24 km (1 mi) bridge is the fourth longest bridge in Malaysia across a river, and also the third longest bridge in Borneo after Tayan Bridge in Tayan, Sanggau, West Kalimantan, Indonesia.
