= Batang Mukah Bridge =

Batang Mukah Bridge Jambatan Batang Mukah
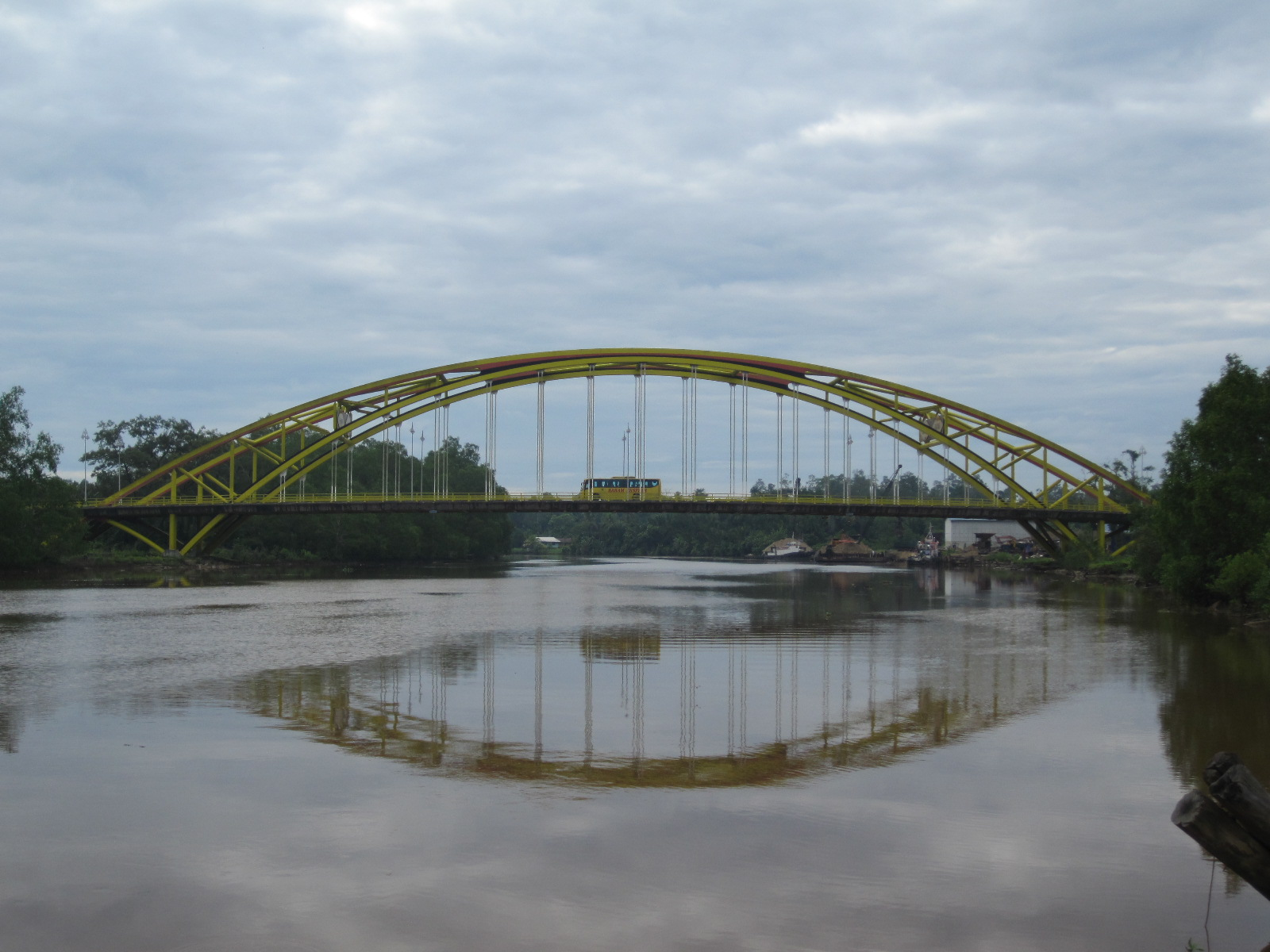
- Coordinates: 2°53′41″N 112°06′41″E
- Carries: Motor vehicles
- Crosses: Mukah River
- Locale: Jalan Mukah-Balingian
- Official name: Batang Mukah Bridge
- Maintained by: Sarawak Public Works Department (JKR)

Characteristics
- Design: truss girder bridge

History
- Designer: State Government of Sarawak; Sarawak Public Works Department (JKR)
- Constructed by: Sarawak Public Works Department (JKR)

Location
- Interactive map of Batang Mukah Bridge

The Batang Mukah Bridge or Mukah Bridge is a landmark bridge in Mukah town in Mukah Division, Sarawak, Malaysia.
