= The Astana, Sarawak =

The Astana
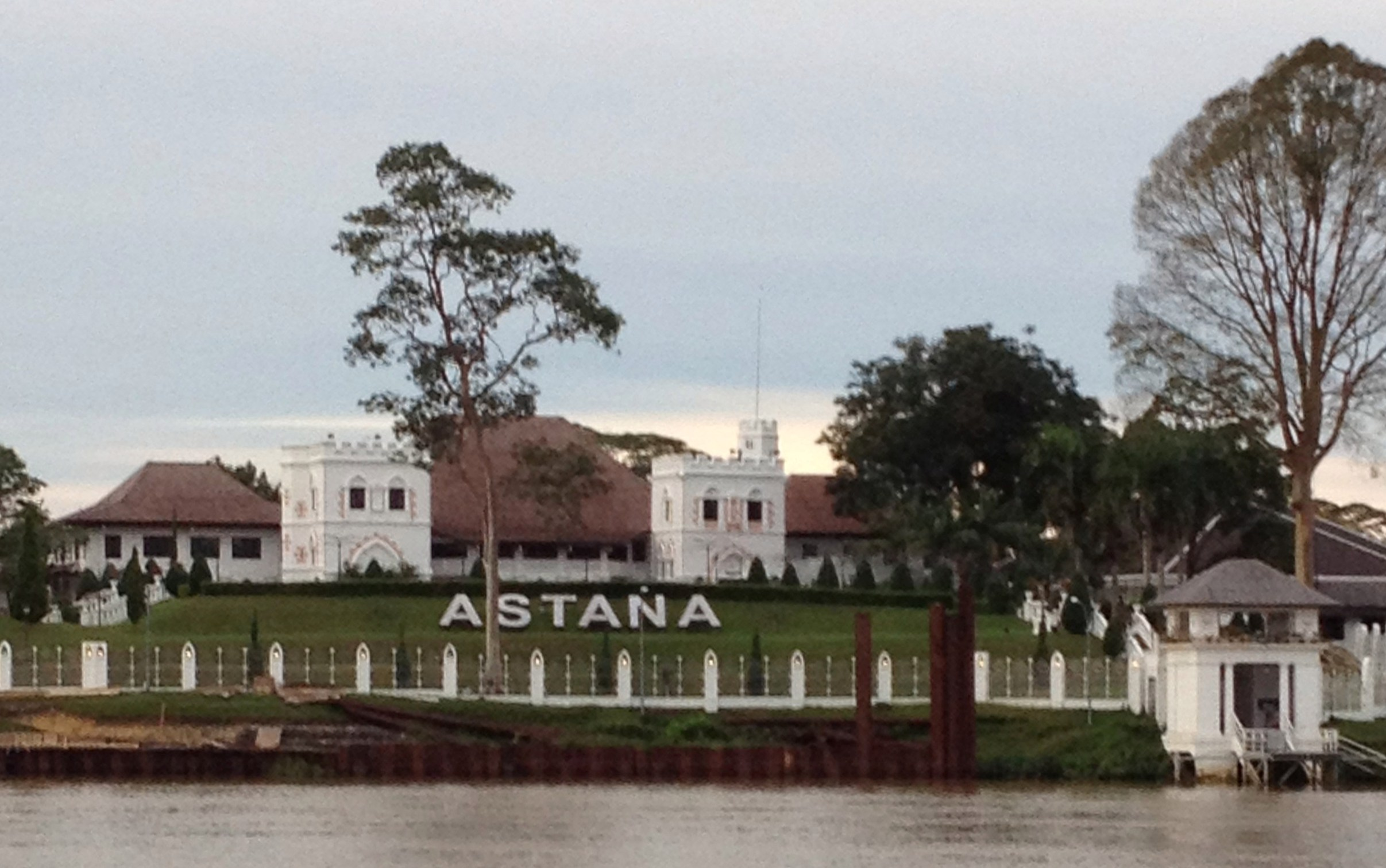
- Front view of the building from the Kuching Waterfront
- Interactive map of the The Astana area

General information
- Status: Completed
- Type: Official residence
- Location: Kuching, Sarawak, Malaysia
- Coordinates: 1°33′49″N 110°20′44″E
- Current tenants: Wan Junaidi Tuanku Jaafar, the Yang di-Pertua Negeri of Sarawak
- Construction started: 1870; 156 years ago
- Completed: 1888; 138 years ago

Technical details
- Floor count: 1
- Lifts/elevators: None

The Astana (Malay: Astana Sarawak) is a palace in Kuching, Sarawak, Malaysia, on the north bank of the Sarawak River, opposite the Kuching Waterfront. It is the official residence of the Yang di-Pertua Negeri Sarawak (Governor of Sarawak). The name is a variation of 'istana', meaning 'palace'. It was built in 1870 by the second White Rajah, Charles Brooke, as a wedding gift to his wife, Margaret Alice Lili de Windt. The palace is not normally open to the public, although the landscaped gardens are, which can be reached by a boat ride across the Sarawak River. It is part of the Kuching Heritage Trail.

== History ==
The Astana, then called Government House, was built in 1870 by the second White Rajah, Charles Brooke, as a wedding gift to his wife, Margaret Alice Lili de Windt. The couple married at Highworth, Wiltshire on 28 October 1869 and she was then raised to the title of Ranee of Sarawak with the style of Her Highness. Ranee Margaret arrived in Sarawak in 1870, and the royal couple then occupied The Astana as their main home. She later reminisced about life in The Astana and colonial Borneo in her memoir My Life in Sarawak, which was published in 1913. Brooke is said to have cultivated betel nut in a small plantation behind The Astana, so that he could offer fresh betel nut to visiting Dayak chiefs.

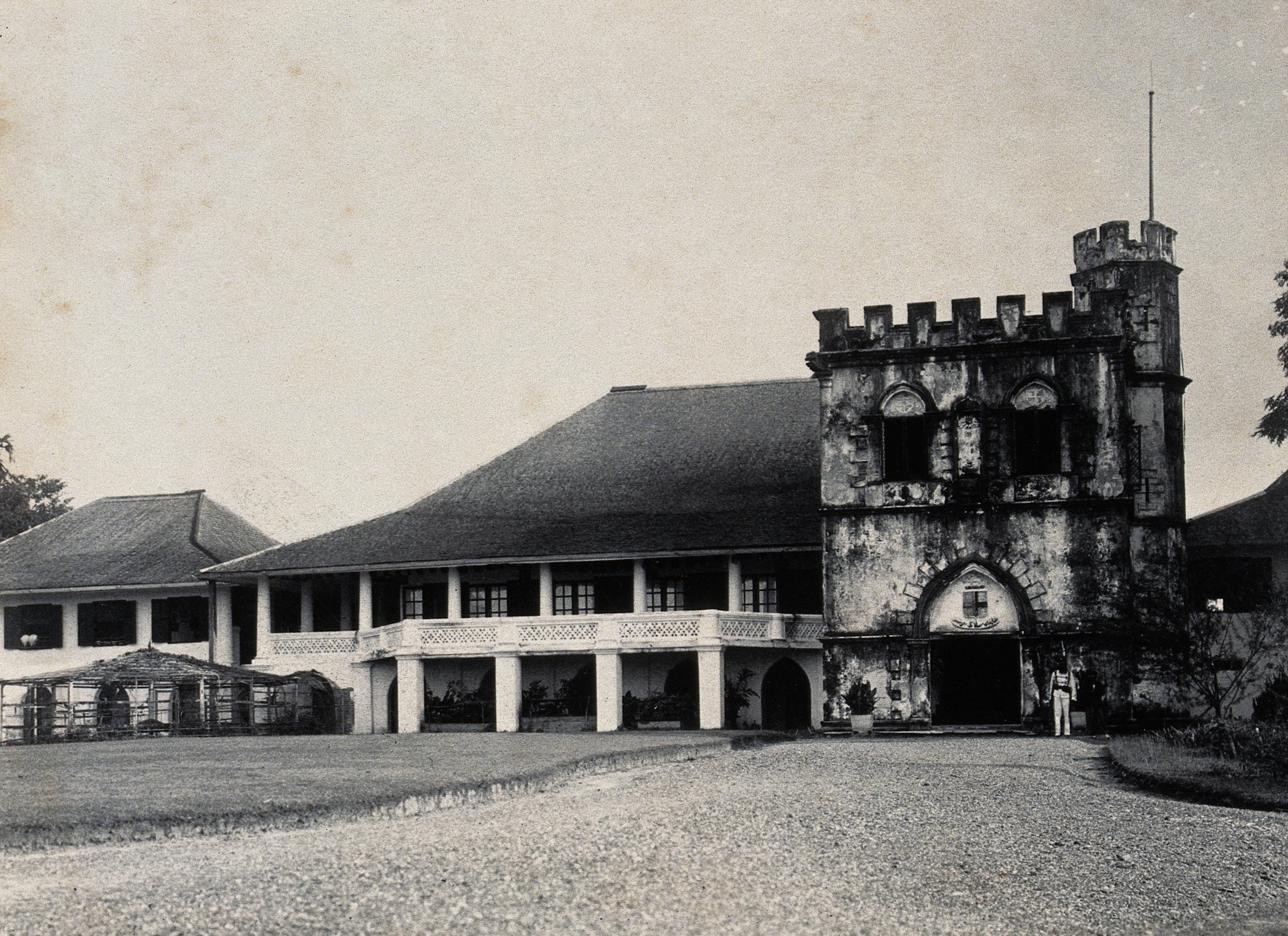
The Astana in 1896

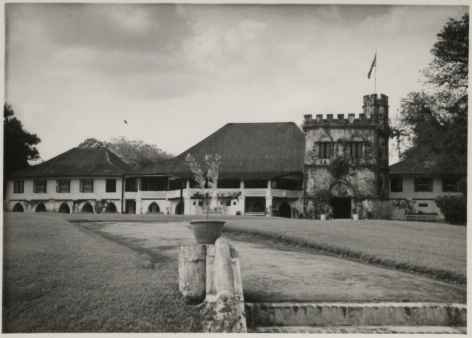
The Astana in 1959

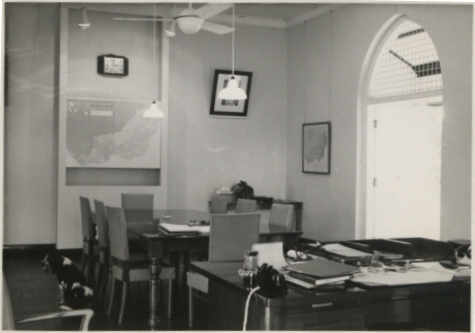
The Governor's office in 1959

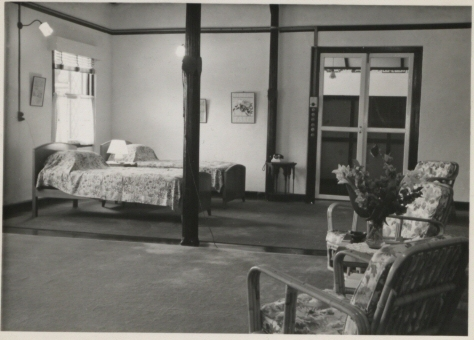
Ranee's bedroom in 1959

== Architecture ==
The residence was originally three separate buildings, which were interconnected by short and narrow passageways. The Astana has since undergone major renovations and alterations befitting it as the official residence of the governor of Sarawak.

== See also ==
- New Sarawak State Legislative Assembly Building
- Wisma Bapa Malaysia
