= Pusa, Sarawak =

Pusa Town Pekan Pusa
- Location within Borneo
- Coordinates: 1°35′0″N 111°15′0″E
- Country: Malaysia
- State: Sarawak

Pusa (Malay: Pekan Pusa) is a town in Pusa District, Betong Division, Sarawak, Malaysia. It is situated nearby Saratok town. Mostly form for native Malay for fish village and famous of fish of "ikan terubok" (Toli shad) and also famous for "gula apong" (palm sugar).

== Education ==
=== Primary school ===
- Sekolah Kebangsaan Pusa
- SJKC Chung Hua
- Sekolah Kebangsaan Kalok
- Sekolah Kebangsaan Tambbak
- Sekolah Kebangsaan Serabang

=== Secondary school ===
- Sekolah Menengah Kebangsaan Pusa
