= Asajaya District =

Asajaya
- Town and district capital
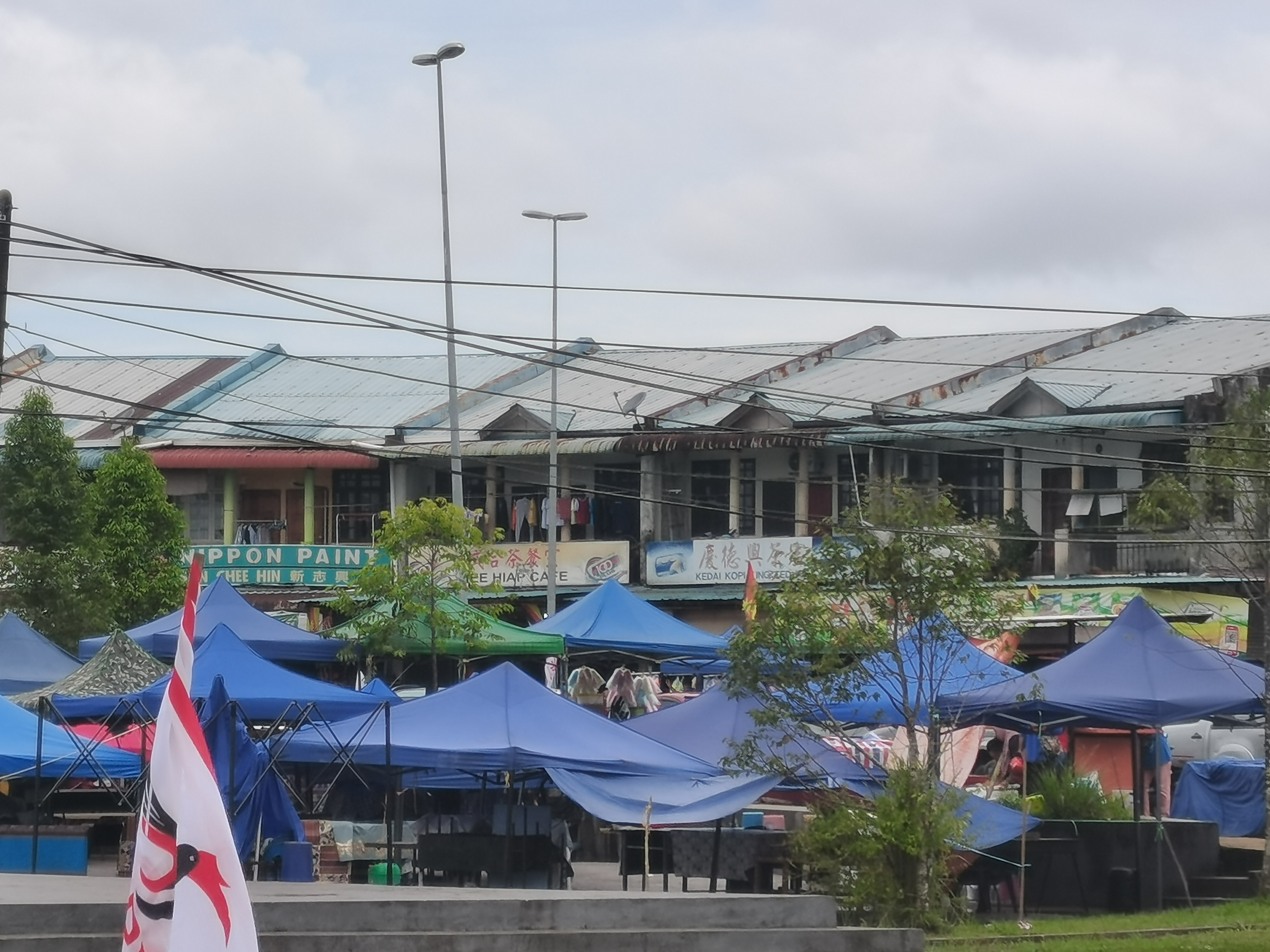
- The Asajaya bazaar

- Location within East Malaysia
- Coordinates: 1°34′42″N 110°34′52″E
- Country: Malaysia
- State: Sarawak
- Division: Samarahan
- District: Asajaya

Asajaya is a small rural town located in Samarahan Division, Sarawak, Malaysia.

== History ==
Asajaya was formerly known as Nonok. It was created as a sub-district under Kuching District on 1 October 1970. In 1993, Asajaya was put under the administration of the newly formed Samarahan Division. At the same time, the sub-district changed its name to "Asajaya". Asajaya was upgraded to a district on 31 December 1999.

== Geography and climate ==
There are two sub-districts in the Asajaya district; Asajaya sub-district (389.52 km^{2}) and Sadong Jaya sub-district (332.48km^{2}), totaling 722.0 km^{2}. There are 19 villages in the district, including Sambir, Serpan, Asajaya, Sebandi, Moyan, and Semera.

Asajaya district's primary forest cover reduced from 96.1% in 2010 to 68.9% in 2022. Asajaya has a tropical rainforest climate (Af) with heavy to very heavy rainfall year-round.

Climate data for Asajaya
Month	Jan	Feb	Mar	Apr	May	Jun	Jul	Aug	Sep	Oct	Nov	Dec	Year
Mean daily maximum °C (°F)	29.8 (85.6)	30.0 (86.0)	31.0 (87.8)	32.0 (89.6)	32.5 (90.5)	32.2 (90.0)	32.2 (90.0)	32.0 (89.6)	31.7 (89.1)	31.6 (88.9)	31.3 (88.3)	30.6 (87.1)	31.4 (88.5)
Daily mean °C (°F)	26.1 (79.0)	26.2 (79.2)	26.9 (80.4)	27.4 (81.3)	27.8 (82.0)	27.5 (81.5)	27.4 (81.3)	27.2 (81.0)	27.1 (80.8)	27.1 (80.8)	26.9 (80.4)	26.6 (79.9)	27.0 (80.6)
Mean daily minimum °C (°F)	22.5 (72.5)	22.5 (72.5)	22.8 (73.0)	22.9 (73.2)	23.2 (73.8)	22.9 (73.2)	22.6 (72.7)	22.5 (72.5)	22.6 (72.7)	22.7 (72.9)	22.6 (72.7)	22.6 (72.7)	22.7 (72.9)
Average rainfall mm (inches)	555 (21.9)	421 (16.6)	304 (12.0)	269 (10.6)	242 (9.5)	191 (7.5)	186 (7.3)	243 (9.6)	263 (10.4)	309 (12.2)	344 (13.5)	471 (18.5)	3,798 (149.6)
Source: Climate-Data.org

== Demographics ==
Ethnic composition of Asajaya District (2010)
Ethnicities / Nationality	Percentage
Malays	83.46%
Iban	8.31%
Bidayuh	0.57%
Melanau	0.2%
Other Bumiputeras	0.15%
Chinese	6.53%
Indians	0.06%
Others	0.05%
Non-Malaysian	0.65%

Ethnicity	2010	
Ethnicity	Pop.	%
Malays	26032	83.46%
Iban	2593	8.31%
Bidayuh	177	0.57%
Melanau	63	0.2%
Other Bumiputeras	48	0.15%
Chinese	2038	6.53%
Indians	18	0.06%
Others	17	0.05%
Malaysian total	30986	99.35%
Non-Malaysian	204	0.65%
Total	31190	100.00%

Historical population
Year	Pop.	±%
2000	28,513	—
2010	31,874	+11.8%
2020	37,900	+18.9%
Figures for 1991 are included under Samarahan District. Source:

According to the last census in 2010, the population of the district was estimated to be around 31,874 inhabitants. The district of Asajaya is predominantly Malay/Muslims (almost 85%), thus making this one of the Sarawakian districts with "heavy" Malay/Muslim population; the rest of the population consists of some local Chinese, Ibans and other indigenous groups.

== Infrastructure ==
Before roads were built, the Asajaya district was only connected to other parts of Sarawak through the sea. Asajaya is now connected to Kota Samarahan and other areas in Sarawak such as Simunjan District through the Coastal Road Network.

In 2021, Agrobank and RHB bank started a mobile ATM service in Asajaya and Sadong Jaya.

=== Local bus ===
Route no.	Operating route	Operator
K12	Kuching-Kota Samarahan-Asajaya-Sadong Jaya	CPL

== Economy ==
Asajaya Drainage Scheme is a long-term project spanning over 20 years, covering 18,143 hectares in the Asajaya district for agriculture development. Among the crops planted are coconuts, paddy, cocoa, palm oil, fruits, and vegetables.
