= Samarahan Division =

Samarahan
- Divisions of Sarawak

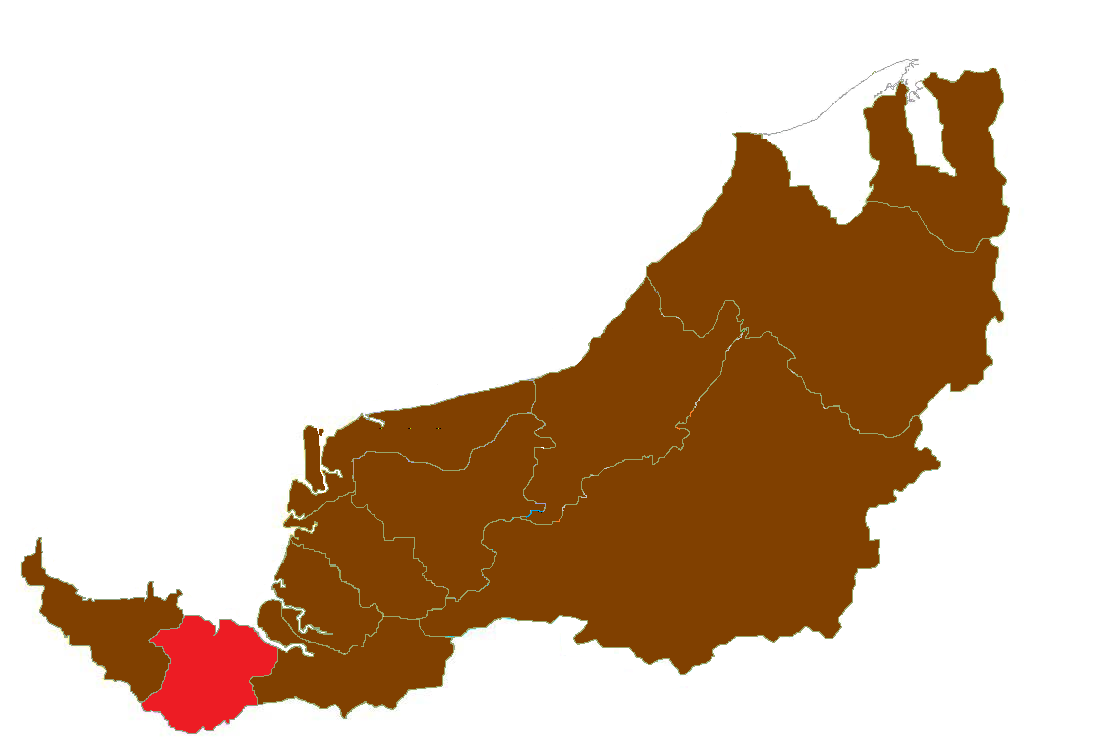
- Country: Malaysia
- Division Office location: Kota Samarahan
- Local area government(s): Majlis Perbandaran Kota Samarahan (MPKS) (Samarahan; Gedong; Sebuyau and Asajaya); Majlis Daerah Simunjan (MDS)

Area
  - Total: 4,967.4 km^{2} (1,917.9 sq mi)

Population (2010)
  - Total: 246,782
  - Density: 49.680/km^{2} (128.67/sq mi)
- Resident: Mohamad Irwan Bahari Bujang
- License plate prefix: QC
- Demographics: 56% Malay, 30% Iban, 15% Chinese, 1%Bidayuh, 1% Melanau, 1% Orang Ulu,0.5% Eurasian, 0.5% Indian ,1% Non Citizen

Samarahan Division is one of the twelve administrative divisions in Sarawak, Malaysia. Formerly part of the First Division, which included Kuching, it became a separate Division on 24 July 1986, with a total area of 4,967.4 square kilometres.

Samarahan Division formerly contained five administrative districts: Samarahan, Asajaya, Gedong, Sebuyau and Simunjan. The total population was 246,782 (year 2010 census). but on 11 April 2015 the Serian District was separated to form a new Division. The population is Majority of Malay almost 66% and follow by Iban, Chinese, Bidayuh, Melanau, Orang Ulu, Eurasian and Indian.

On 11 November 2016, the status of Majlis Daerah Samarahan has been upgraded to Majlis Perbandaran Kota Samarahan, giving Kota Samarahan, the capital of Samarahan division from small town to town. The declaration took place in Kota Samarahan by the then Premier of Sarawak, Pehin Sri (Dr.) Haji Adenan bin Haji Satem. He was represented by his deputy, Deputy Premier, Tan Sri Datuk Amar James Jemut Masing.

== Administration ==
=== Members of Parliament ===
Parliament	Member of Parliament	Party
P197 Kota Samarahan	YB Puan Rubiah Wang	GPS (PBB)
P199 Serian	YB Dato Sri Richard Riot Jaem	GPS (SUPP)
P200 Batang Sadong	YB Dato Sri Rodiyah Sapiee	GPS (PBB)
P201 Batang Lupar	YB Dato' Sri Rohani Abdul Karim	GPS (PBB)
