= Sarawak River =

River in Sarawak, Malaysia

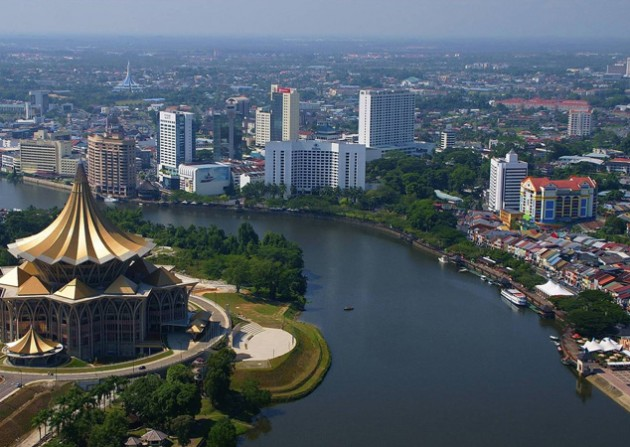
- Sarawak River seen from Kuching
- Native name: Sungai Sarawak

Location
- Country: Malaysia
- State: Kuching
- Division: Kuching

Physical characteristics
- Mouth
  - location: South China Sea
  - coordinates: 1.6380°N 110.4996°E
  - elevation: 0 m (0 ft)

Sarawak River (Malay: Sungai Sarawak) is located in Kuching, the capital city of Sarawak, Malaysia. It serves as a primary water source for both domestic and industrial use in Kuching and the surrounding areas. The river also plays an essential role in navigation, connecting several city landmarks via river taxis. Additionally, it supports tourism and cultural heritage through water-based activities such as the Sarawak Regatta. During the rainy season, the Sarawak River contributes to flood management through the operation of the Kuching Barrage and Shiplock, while also functioning as a drainage channel, collecting stormwater and wastewater before discharging into the South China Sea.

== Geography ==
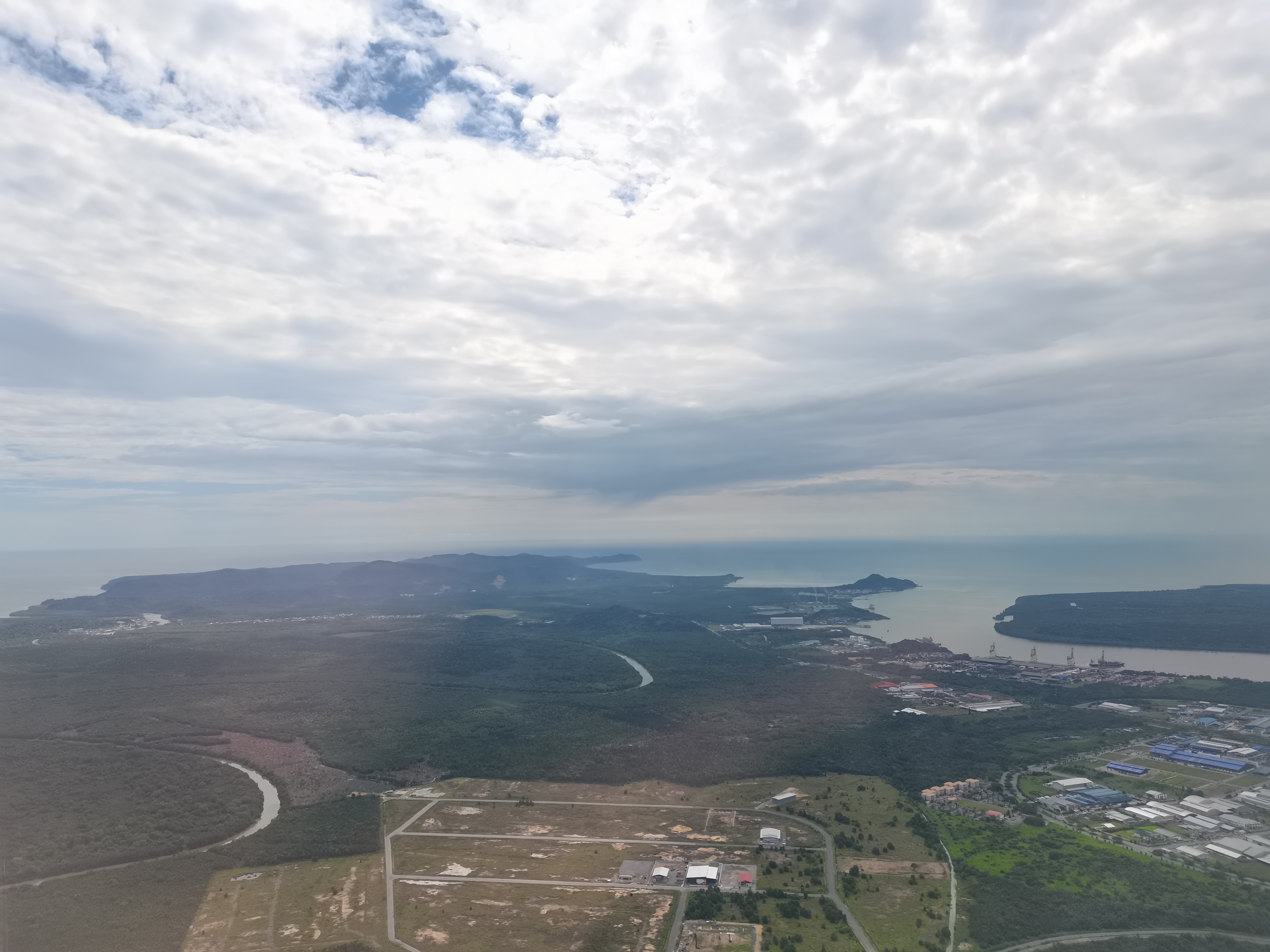
Right: Mouth of the Sarawak River; Left: Bako National Park

The Sarawak River lies in the southwest of Borneo and forms the main watercourse of the Sarawak River Basin with a total area of approximately 2,459 square kilometres (949 sq mi). The river originates from the Kapuas Mountains along the international frontier with Indonesia and extends for approximately 120 kilometres (75 mi) before it attains its estuary at Muara Tebas. Two principal tributaries of the Sarawak River are Sungai Sarawak Kanan and Sungai Sarawak Kiri. Other important tributaries include Kuap River, Tengah River, Maong River, Bintangor River, and Padungan River.

Sarawak's capital city, Kuching, lies along the Sarawak River and is the biggest urbanised settlement in the basin and comprises both Kuching North and Kuching South. Other large towns and settlements in the river basin include Padawan, the 7th Mile Town, and the 12th Mile Town. Large landmarks such as the Kuching International Airport and the Borneo Convention Centre are also in the Sarawak Basin. Further inland, Bau, Batu Kawa, and the old settlement of Siniawan are along the river course.

== History ==
Before the Brooke era, Sarawak belonged to the Sultanate of Brunei, and hence the strong Malay cultural influences today along the Sarawak River. The river cuts through the capital city of Sarawak, Kuching, and many Malay kampung villages occupy its banks. These riverine villageshave long depended on the river as their means of daily sustenance and livelihood. The Malay people have for centuries preferred to live along the river, engaging in traditional livelihoods that rely on it.

== Developments ==
The Sarawak River is the prime river in servicing Kuching and the suburbs through its dual roles of providing water, flood control, transportation, and environmental regulation. One of the key components of such infrastructure is the Batu Kitang Water Treatment Plant (BKWTP) at Sungai Sarawak Kiri approximately 40 miles (64 km) from the sea, which supplied over 98% of treated water for Kuching City since its commissioning in 1957. In order to offer a safe source of water supply, a 1.5-metre high submersible weir was constructed in 2005 downstream of the plant, raising river levels, preventing saline intrusion, and offering constant intake during dry periods while allowing small boat passage through a double-locked gate.

Still further downstream, Sungai Sarawak Regulation Scheme, completed in 2000, introduced Southeast Asia's first combined tidal exclusion barrage, ship lock, and bridge system, the Kuching Barrage. All this infrastructure regulates the water level of the rivers, protects Kuching from fluvial and tidal flooding, protects the city's water supply from saltwater intrusion, keeps from coastal sedimentation on sites such as Santubong and Damai, and maintains open navigational channels between Pending and Sejingkat.

Bengoh Dam, completed in 2010, is located on Bengoh River, which is a tributary of Sungai Sarawak Kiri, about 56.5 kilometres from Kuching. It was constructed to provide a consistent raw water supply for the BKWTP, particularly during periods of drought. The dam holds historical importance as it marks an important water development in Sarawak which has been addressing rising urban demands since the mid-20th century. Built with 160,000 cubic metres (5,700,000 cu ft) of roller-compacted concrete, the dam stands 63.2 metres high and 267 metres wide. The reservoir of its 8.77 square kilometres area has a storage capacity of 144 million cubic metres, sufficient to provide water to 1.7 million people up to 2030.

== Transportations and crossings ==
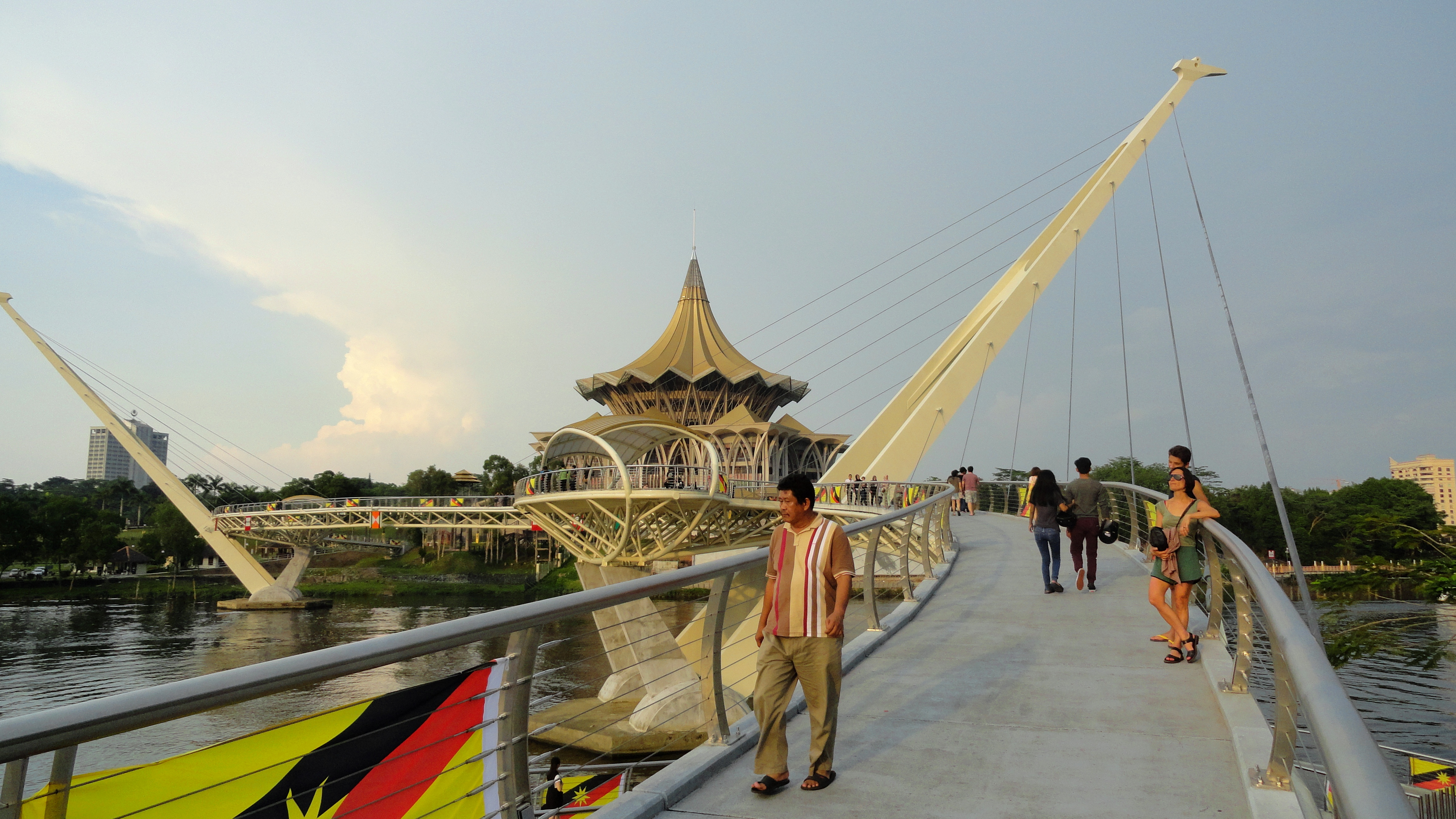
Darul Hana Bridge in 2018

The Darul Hana Bridge, also known as the Golden Bridge, connects Kuching North and South across the Sarawak River. Completed in June 2017, it features an S-shaped design symbolising cultural harmony through its reference to yin and yang, with two outward-inclined masts supporting a curved steel tube truss. Built using the balanced cantilever method, the pedestrian bridge offers resting points with panoramic views of the river, city skyline, and the State Legislative Assembly Building.

The Satok Suspension Bridge, Sarawak's first and oldest "jambatan gantung," was constructed in 1926 under British colonial rule to carry water pipelines from the Matang Reservoir across the Sarawak River to Kuching. Its construction, led by engineer A.S. Lowe after decades of controversy and compromise, took 24 years to be completed, with the original plan later changed due to technical problems on pipeline weight. The 18-metre-high suspension bridge spanning 700 feet became a lifeline linking the city's north and south banks. It stoodwatch over generations of everyday existence, but it was in 1992 that safety issues prompted closure, and it was totally destroyed by a violent storm in 2004. The reconstruction effort, led by Abang Johari in 2017, involved a new bridge being built to modern standards by March 2021. The new bridge reopened later in the same year.

== Flora and fauna ==
The Sarawak River and its tributaries support rich diversity of endemic aquatic plant species, especially of the genus Cryptocoryne. One suchgood example is Cryptocoryne longicauda, which was collected from one of the upper tributaries of the river. It is significant inreconstructing the biogeographical history of the region, suggesting that Johor and Sarawak have previously had connections. The river also contains a high diversity of fish and aquatic plants. Atack (2006) offered a field guide to the Sarawak River fishes, where the kelah or emparau (Tor tambroides), terubok (Tenualosa sp.), and freshwater prawn udang galah (Macrobrachium rosenbergii) were among the highlighted species. Two of the important riverine ecosystems include Nypa fruticans (nipah palm) community and mangrove vegetation communities, both of which are required habitats for prawns, fish, crabs, and other commercial aquatic animals.
