= Simunjan District =

- District of Malaysia
- Daerah Simunjan
- Seal
- Interactive map of Simunjan District
- Location of Simunjan District in Malaysia
- Coordinates: 1°22′59″N 110°45′0″E
- Country: Malaysia
- State: Sarawak
- Division: Samarahan
- Seat: Simunjan
- Local area government(s): Simunjan District Council

Government
  - District officer: Abd. Khalid B. Manap

Area
  - Total: 1,370.12 km^{2} (529.01 sq mi)
- Elevation: 54 m (177 ft)

Population (2025)
  - Total: 28,870
  - Density: 21.07/km^{2} (54.57/sq mi)
- Time zone: UTC+8 (MST)
  - Summer (DST): UTC+8 (Not observed)
- Postcode: 947xx - 948xx
- Calling code: +6-082
- Vehicle registration plates: QC

The Simunjan District is a district in the Samarahan Division of Sarawak, Malaysia, located between the towns of Serian and Sri Aman. It borders Sebuyau and Samarahan and lies 51.4 kilometres (32 mi) east-south-east of the state capital Kuching.

Most of its population is made up of Malay and Iban people.

== Etymology ==
There are a few deviations regarding the origin of Simunjan's name. The first being when a Chinese merchant went to dry tobaccos during cloudy weather. Based on this folklore, a Chinese merchant came to Simunjan on a boat known as Wangkang (Djong (ship)) to rest. While at Simunjan, he tried to dry his tobaccos in the sun, but the weather was cloudy. A local told them that his "Jan" ("tobacco" in Chinese) will be "Semun" (or "damp"); "Semunlah jan kau kelak" ("Your tobacco will get damp.") Since this encounter, the place have been known as "Simunjan."

Another oral tradition speaks of Simunjan coming from the word "Semun" and "Hujan" (or "rain".) In this version, the Simunjan people originated from an area known as "Ensengei" that migrated to Simunjan. Most of them worked as miners. While trying to start a match, the match was damp due to the frequent rainfall. Because this area was still unnamed, people combined "Semun" and "Hujan" to refer this place, hence "Simunjan."

Based on another source, Simunjan got its name from "Burung Munjan" ("Munjan Bird.") Burung Munjan was to believe a bird native to Simunjan that was abundant within Gunung Ngeli forest. Simunjan derived from the phrase "Si Munjan" (or "The Munjan") hence its name. However, there are limited resources that provide additional details about this version, except for a few mentions from locals. A statue of Burung Munjan was erected around 1990 at Padang Sentral (Central Park) before being moved to Majlis Daerah Simunjan. It is believed that Burung Munjan went extinct due to rampant human activities in Simunjan.

== Notable people ==
- Alfred Russel Wallace – spent much of 1855 collecting natural history specimens while guest of the coal mine manager, as recounted in The Malay Archipelago: land of the orang-utan...
- Sapok Biki – Malaysian boxer who won a gold medal during the 1998 Commonwealth Games in Kuala Lumpur is a Simunjan native.

== Climate ==
Simunjan has a tropical rainforest climate (Af) with heavy to very heavy rainfall year-round.

Climate data for Simunjan
| Month | Jan | Feb | Mar | Apr | May | Jun | Jul | Aug | Sep | Oct | Nov | Dec | Year |
|---|---|---|---|---|---|---|---|---|---|---|---|---|---|
| Mean daily maximum °C (°F) | 29.9 (85.8) | 30.2 (86.4) | 31.1 (88.0) | 32.0 (89.6) | 32.4 (90.3) | 32.2 (90.0) | 32.1 (89.8) | 32.0 (89.6) | 31.8 (89.2) | 31.7 (89.1) | 31.4 (88.5) | 30.7 (87.3) | 31.5 (88.6) |
| Daily mean °C (°F) | 26.2 (79.2) | 26.4 (79.5) | 26.9 (80.4) | 27.4 (81.3) | 27.8 (82.0) | 27.5 (81.5) | 27.2 (81.0) | 27.2 (81.0) | 27.2 (81.0) | 27.2 (81.0) | 27.0 (80.6) | 26.6 (79.9) | 27.1 (80.7) |
| Mean daily minimum °C (°F) | 22.5 (72.5) | 22.6 (72.7) | 22.8 (73.0) | 22.9 (73.2) | 23.2 (73.8) | 22.8 (73.0) | 22.4 (72.3) | 22.5 (72.5) | 22.6 (72.7) | 22.7 (72.9) | 22.6 (72.7) | 22.5 (72.5) | 22.7 (72.8) |
| Average rainfall mm (inches) | 471 (18.5) | 358 (14.1) | 284 (11.2) | 272 (10.7) | 246 (9.7) | 188 (7.4) | 180 (7.1) | 254 (10.0) | 275 (10.8) | 308 (12.1) | 349 (13.7) | 445 (17.5) | 3,630 (142.8) |
Source: Climate-Data.org
