= Bibliography of Sarawak =

This page includes non-fiction books, articles and documents about Sarawak. Such bibliographies have been compiled since the British period, as well as in other publications. Specialised bibliographies of ethnic groups in Sarawak have been published by Universiti Malaysia Sarawak. The Sarawak State Library maintains its own bibliography.

== Books ==
Author Last	Author First	Date	Title
Keppel	Henry	1846	The Expedition to Borneo of H.M.S. Dido for the Suppression of Piracy: Vol 1
Keppel	Henry	1846	The Expedition to Borneo of H.M.S. Dido for the Suppression of Piracy: Vol 2
Brooke	James	1842	A letter from Borneo : with notices of the country and its inhabitants, addressed to James Gardner
Mundy	Rodney	1848	Narrative of Events in Borneo and Celebes, down to the Occupation of Labuan: from the Journals of James Brooke, Esq. Vol. 1
Mundy	Rodney	1848	Narrative of Events in Borneo and Celebes, down to the Occupation of Labuan: from the Journals of James Brooke, Esq. Vol. 2
Belcher	Edward	1848	Narrative of the Voyage of H.M.S. Samarang, During the Years 1843-46; Employed surveying the Islands of the Eastern Archipelago Vol. 1
Belcher	Edward	1848	Narrative of the Voyage of H.M.S. Samarang, During the Years 1843-46; Employed surveying the Islands of the Eastern Archipelago Vol. 2
Marryat	Frank	1848	Borneo and the Indian Archipelago with Drawings of Costume and Scenery
McDougall	Harriette	1854	Letters from Sarawak; Addressed to a Child
McDougall	Harriette	1882	Sketches of Our Life at Sarawak
Brooke	Charles	1866	Ten Years in Sarawak Vol. 1
Brooke	Charles	1866	Ten Years in Sarawak Vol. 2
Helms	Ludvig Verner	1882	Pioneering in the Far East
Foggo	George	1853	Adventures of Sir James Brooke, K.C.B., Rajah of Sarawak, "sovereign de facto of Borneo proper," late governor of Labuan : from Rajah Brooke's own diary and correspondence, or from government official documents
Templer	John Charles	1853	The Private Letters of Sir James Brooke, K.C.B. Rajah of Sarawak, Narrating the Events of his Life, from 1838 to the Present Time Vol. 1
Templer	John Charles	1853	The Private Letters of Sir James Brooke, K.C.B. Rajah of Sarawak, Narrating the Events of his Life, from 1838 to the Present Time Vol. 2
Templer	John Charles	1853	The Private Letters of Sir James Brooke, K.C.B. Rajah of Sarawak, Narrating the Events of his Life, from 1838 to the Present Time Vol. 3
Brooke	James	1853	A Vindication of His Character and Proceedings: In Reply to the Statements Privately Printed and Circulated by Joseph Hume Esq. M.P.
Jacob	Gertrude L.	1876	The Raja of Sarawak: An Account of Sir James Brooke, given chiefly through Letters and Journals, in Two Volumes, Vol. I
Jacob	Gertrude L.	1876	The Raja of Sarawak: An Account of Sir James Brooke, given chiefly through Letters and Journals, in Two Volumes, Vol. II
Earl	George Windsor	1837	The Eastern seas; or, Voyages and adventures in the Indian Archipelago, in 1832-33-34, comprising a tour of the island of Java -- visits to Borneo, the Malay Peninsula, Siam &c
St. John	Horace	1853	The Indian Archipelago: Its History and Present State, Volume 1
St. John	Horace	1853	The Indian Archipelago: Its History and Present State, Volume 2
Boyle	Frederick	1865	Adventures Among the Dyaks of Borneo
Pfeiffer	Ida Laura	1855	Lady’s Second Journey Round the World Vol. 1
Pfeiffer	Ida Laura	1855	Lady’s Second Journey Round the World Vol. 2
Gomes	Edwin H.	1911	Seventeen years among the Sea Dyaks of Borneo; a record of intimate association with the natives of the Bornean jungles
Gomes	Edwin H.	1912	Children of Borneo
Dennison	Noel	1879	Jottings made during a tour amongst the Land Dyaks of upper Sarawak, Borneo, during the year 1874
Grant	Charles Thomas Constantine	1864	A tour amongst the Dyaks of Sarāwak (Borneo) in 1858
North	Marianne	1893	Recollections of a happy life : being the autobiography of Marianne North Vol. 1
North	Marianne	1893	Recollections of a happy life : being the autobiography of Marianne North Vol. 2
Baden-Powell	Baden	1892	In savage isles and settled lands. Malaysia, Australasia and Polynesia, 1888-1891
Wallace	Alfred Russel	1869	The Malay Archipelago : the land of the oranguatan, and the bird of paradise. A narrative of travel, with studies of man and nature
Collingwood	Cuthbert	1868	Rambles of a naturalist on the shores and waters of the China Sea : being observations in natural history during a voyage to China, Formosa, Borneo, Singapore, etc., made in Her Majesty's vessels in 1866 and 1867
Beccari	Odoardo	1904	Wanderings in the great forests of Borneo; travels and researches of a naturalist in Sarawak
St. John	James Augustus	1847	Views in the Eastern Archipelago : Borneo, Sarawak, Labuan, &c.
Roth	Henry Ling	1896	Natives of Sarawak and British North Borneo : based chiefly on the MSS. of the late Hugh Brooke Low, Sarawak Government Service Vol. 1
Roth	Henry Ling	1896	Natives of Sarawak and British North Borneo : based chiefly on the MSS. of the late Hugh Brooke Low, Sarawak Government Service Vol. 2
Low	Hugh	1848	Sarawak; its inhabitants and productions: being notes during a residence in that country with His Excellency Mr. Brooke
Hose	Charles	1912	The pagan tribes of Borneo; a description of their physical, moral and intellectual condition, with some discussion of their ethnic relations Vol. 1
Hose	Charles	1912	The pagan tribes of Borneo; a description of their physical, moral and intellectual condition, with some discussion of their ethnic relations Vol. 2
Keppel	Henry	1853	A visit to the Indian archipelago, in H.M. ship Mæander : with portions of the private journal of Sir James Brooke, K.C.B. Vol 1
Keppel	Henry	1853	A visit to the Indian archipelago, in H.M. ship Mæander : with portions of the private journal of Sir James Brooke, K.C.B. Vol 2
Keppel	Henry	1899	A sailor's life under four sovereigns Vol. 1
Keppel	Henry	1899	A sailor's life under four sovereigns Vol. 2
Keppel	Henry	1899	A sailor's life under four sovereigns Vol. 3
St. John	Spenser	1862	Life in the forests of the Far East Vol. 1
St. John	Spenser	1862	Life in the forests of the Far East Vol. 2
St. John	Spenser	1879	The Life of Sir James Brooke, Rajah of Sarawak: From His Personal Papers and Correspondence
St. John	Spenser	1899	Rajah Brooke: the Englishman as ruler of an eastern state
Baring-Gould	Sabine	1909	A History of Sarawak under its Two White Rajahs, 1839-1908
Rutter	Edward Owen	1935	Rajah Brooke and Baroness Burdett Coutts : consisting of the letters / from Sir James Brooke, first white Rajah of Sarawak to Miss Angela (afterwards Baroness) Burdett Coutts, edited...by Owen Rutter
Brooke	Margaret	1913	My life in Sarawak
Green	Eda	1909	Borneo, the land of river and palm
Bunyon	Charles John	1889	Memoirs of Francis Thomas McDougall ... sometime bishop of Labuan and Sarawak, and of Harriette, his wife
Brassey	Anna	1887	The last voyage
Runciman	Steven	1960	The White Rajahs: a History of Sarawak from 1841 to 1946
Treacher	William Hood	1891	British Borneo: sketches of Brunai, Sarawak, Labuan, and North Borneo

== Web Articles ==
Site	Author	Date	Title
The Borneo Post		16 Sep 2011	Chronology of Sarawak throughout the Brooke Era to Malaysia Day
The New York Times		13 Jul 1986	Sarawak: A Kingdom in the Jungle
The London Gazette	Stephen Luscombe		Sarawak: A Most Unusual Territory
Government of Sarawak		2014	The Brooke Era (1841-1941)
The Borneo Post	Joanna Yap	2016	Tracing influence of Brunei and Sambas in formation of S'wak
