= Bibliography of Malaysia =

Malaysia
- Jalur Gemilang ('Stripes of Glory')

== Anthropology ==
| Topic | Author | Date | Title |
|---|---|---|---|
| Orang Asal | Hose | 1912 | The pagan tribes of Borneo; a description of their physical, moral and intellectual condition, with some discussion of their ethnic relations Vol. 1 |
| Orang Asal | Hose | 1912 | The pagan tribes of Borneo; a description of their physical, moral and intellectual condition, with some discussion of their ethnic relations Vol. 2 |
| Iban | Edwin H. Gomes | 1911 | Seventeen years among the Sea Dyaks of Borneo; a record of intimate association with the natives of the Bornean jungles |
| Iban | Edwin H. Gomes | 1912 | Children of Borneo |
| Bidayuh | Noel Dennison | 1879 | Jottings made during a tour amongst the Land Dyaks of upper Sarawak, Borneo, during the year 1874 |
| Orang Asal | Henry Ling Roth | 1896 | Natives of Sarawak and British North Borneo : based chiefly on the MSS. of the late Hugh Brooke Low, Sarawak Government Service Vol. 1 |
| Orang Asal | Henry Ling Roth | 1896 | Natives of Sarawak and British North Borneo : based chiefly on the MSS. of the late Hugh Brooke Low, Sarawak Government Service Vol. 2 |

== Arts and culture ==
| Topic | Author | Date | Title |

== Biography ==
| Subject | Author | Date | Title |

== Business and economy ==
| Topic | Author | Date | Title |

== Fiction, poetry and humour - Malaysian authors ==
| Language | Author | Date | Title |

== Fiction – set in Malaysia - non-Malaysian authors ==
| Setting | Author | Date | Title |

== Science, geography, nature ==
| Topic / Region | Author | Date | Title |
|---|---|---|---|
| Evolution / Sarawak | Alfred Russel Wallace | 1869 | The Malay Archipelago : the land of the oranguatan, and the bird of paradise. A narrative of travel, with studies of man and nature |
| Botany / Sarawak | Odoardo Beccari | 1904 | Wanderings in the great forests of Borneo; travels and researches of a naturalist in Sarawak |

== History ==
=== General history – summaries ===
| Author Last | Author First | Date | Title |
|---|---|---|---|
| St. John | Horace | 1853 | The Indian Archipelago: Its History and Present State, Volume 1 |
| St. John | Horace | 1853 | The Indian Archipelago: Its History and Present State, Volume 2 |

=== Ancient history ===
| Author Last | Author First | Date | Title |

=== Pre-colonial history ===
| Author Last | Author First | Date | Title |

=== Colonial history – Borneo ===
| Author Last | Author First | Date | Title |
|---|---|---|---|
| Keppel | Henry | 1846 | The Expedition to Borneo of H.M.S. Dido for the Suppression of Piracy: Vol 1 |
| Keppel | Henry | 1846 | The Expedition to Borneo of H.M.S. Dido for the Suppression of Piracy: Vol 2 |
| Brooke | James | 1842 | A letter from Borneo : with notices of the country and its inhabitants, addressed to James Gardner |
| Mundy | Rodney | 1848 | Narrative of Events in Borneo and Celebes, down to the Occupation of Labuan: from the Journals of James Brooke, Esq. Vol. 1 |
| Mundy | Rodney | 1848 | Narrative of Events in Borneo and Celebes, down to the Occupation of Labuan: from the Journals of James Brooke, Esq. Vol. 2 |
| Belcher | Edward | 1848 | Narrative of the Voyage of H.M.S. Samarang, During the Years 1843-46; Employed surveying the Islands of the Eastern Archipelago Vol. 1 |
| Belcher | Edward | 1848 | Narrative of the Voyage of H.M.S. Samarang, During the Years 1843-46; Employed surveying the Islands of the Eastern Archipelago Vol. 2 |
| Marryat | Frank | 1848 | Borneo and the Indian Archipelago with Drawings of Costume and Scenery |
| McDougall | Harriette | 1854 | Letters from Sarawak; Addressed to a Child |
| McDougall | Harriette | 1882 | Sketches of Our Life at Sarawak |
| Brooke | Charles | 1866 | Ten Years in Sarawak Vol. 1 |
| Brooke | Charles | 1866 | Ten Years in Sarawak Vol. 2 |
| Helms | Ludvig Verner | 1882 | Pioneering in the Far East |
| Foggo | George | 1853 | Adventures of Sir James Brooke, K.C.B., Rajah of Sarawak, "sovereign de facto of Borneo proper," late governor of Labuan : from Rajah Brooke's own diary and correspondence, or from government official documents |
| Templer | John Charles | 1853 | The Private Letters of Sir James Brooke, K.C.B. Rajah of Sarawak, Narrating the Events of his Life, from 1838 to the Present Time Vol. 1 |
| Templer | John Charles | 1853 | The Private Letters of Sir James Brooke, K.C.B. Rajah of Sarawak, Narrating the Events of his Life, from 1838 to the Present Time Vol. 2 |
| Templer | John Charles | 1853 | The Private Letters of Sir James Brooke, K.C.B. Rajah of Sarawak, Narrating the Events of his Life, from 1838 to the Present Time Vol. 3 |
| Brooke | James | 1853 | A Vindication of His Character and Proceedings: In Reply to the Statements Privately Printed and Circulated by Joseph Hume Esq. M.P. |
| Jacob | Gertrude L. | 1876 | The Raja of Sarawak: An Account of Sir James Brooke, given chiefly through Letters and Journals, in Two Volumes, Vol. I |
| Jacob | Gertrude L. | 1876 | The Raja of Sarawak: An Account of Sir James Brooke, given chiefly through Letters and Journals, in Two Volumes, Vol. II |
| Earl | George Windsor | 1837 | The Eastern seas; or, Voyages and adventures in the Indian Archipelago, in 1832-33-34, comprising a tour of the island of Java -- visits to Borneo, the Malay Peninsula, Siam &c |
| St. John | Horace | 1853 | The Indian Archipelago: Its History and Present State, Volume 1 |
| St. John | Horace | 1853 | The Indian Archipelago: Its History and Present State, Volume 2 |
| Boyle | Frederick | 1865 | Adventures Among the Dyaks of Borneo |
| Pfeiffer | Ida Laura | 1855 | Lady’s Second Journey Round the World Vol. 1 |
| Pfeiffer | Ida Laura | 1855 | Lady’s Second Journey Round the World Vol. 2 |
| Gomes | Edwin H. | 1911 | Seventeen years among the Sea Dyaks of Borneo; a record of intimate association with the natives of the Bornean jungles |
| Gomes | Edwin H. | 1912 | Children of Borneo |
| Dennison | Noel | 1879 | Jottings made during a tour amongst the Land Dyaks of upper Sarawak, Borneo, during the year 1874 |
| Grant | Charles Thomas Constantine | 1864 | A tour amongst the Dyaks of Sarāwak (Borneo) in 1858 |
| North | Marianne | 1893 | Recollections of a happy life : being the autobiography of Marianne North Vol. 1 |
| North | Marianne | 1893 | Recollections of a happy life : being the autobiography of Marianne North Vol. 2 |
| Baden-Powell | Baden | 1892 | In savage isles and settled lands. Malaysia, Australasia and Polynesia, 1888-1891 |
| Wallace | Alfred Russel | 1869 | The Malay Archipelago : the land of the oranguatan, and the bird of paradise. A narrative of travel, with studies of man and nature |
| Collingwood | Cuthbert | 1868 | Rambles of a naturalist on the shores and waters of the China Sea : being observations in natural history during a voyage to China, Formosa, Borneo, Singapore, etc., made in Her Majesty's vessels in 1866 and 1867 |
| Beccari | Odoardo | 1904 | Wanderings in the great forests of Borneo; travels and researches of a naturalist in Sarawak |
| St. John | James Augustus | 1847 | Views in the Eastern Archipelago : Borneo, Sarawak, Labuan, &c. |
| Roth | Henry Ling | 1896 | Natives of Sarawak and British North Borneo : based chiefly on the MSS. of the late Hugh Brooke Low, Sarawak Government Service Vol. 1 |
| Roth | Henry Ling | 1896 | Natives of Sarawak and British North Borneo : based chiefly on the MSS. of the late Hugh Brooke Low, Sarawak Government Service Vol. 2 |
| Low | Hugh | 1848 | Sarawak; its inhabitants and productions: being notes during a residence in that country with His Excellency Mr. Brooke |
| Hose | Charles | 1912 | The pagan tribes of Borneo; a description of their physical, moral and intellectual condition, with some discussion of their ethnic relations Vol. 1 |
| Hose | Charles | 1912 | The pagan tribes of Borneo; a description of their physical, moral and intellectual condition, with some discussion of their ethnic relations Vol. 2 |
| Keppel | Henry | 1853 | A visit to the Indian archipelago, in H.M. ship Mæander : with portions of the private journal of Sir James Brooke, K.C.B. Vol 1 |
| Keppel | Henry | 1853 | A visit to the Indian archipelago, in H.M. ship Mæander : with portions of the private journal of Sir James Brooke, K.C.B. Vol 2 |
| Keppel | Henry | 1899 | A sailor's life under four sovereigns Vol. 1 |
| Keppel | Henry | 1899 | A sailor's life under four sovereigns Vol. 2 |
| Keppel | Henry | 1899 | A sailor's life under four sovereigns Vol. 3 |
| St. John | Spenser | 1862 | Life in the forests of the Far East Vol. 1 |
| St. John | Spenser | 1862 | Life in the forests of the Far East Vol. 2 |
| St. John | Spenser | 1879 | The Life of Sir James Brooke, Rajah of Sarawak: From His Personal Papers and Correspondence |
| St. John | Spenser | 1899 | Rajah Brooke: the Englishman as ruler of an eastern state |
| Baring-Gould | Sabine | 1909 | A History of Sarawak under its Two White Rajahs, 1839-1908 |
| Rutter | Edward Owen | 1935 | Rajah Brooke and Baroness Burdett Coutts : consisting of the letters / from Sir James Brooke, first white Rajah of Sarawak to Miss Angela (afterwards Baroness) Burdett Coutts, edited...by Owen Rutter |
| Brooke | Margaret | 1913 | My life in Sarawak |
| Green | Eda | 1909 | Borneo, the land of river and palm |
| Bunyon | Charles John | 1889 | Memoirs of Francis Thomas McDougall ... sometime bishop of Labuan and Sarawak, and of Harriette, his wife |
| Brassey | Anna | 1887 | The last voyage |
| Runciman | Steven | 1960 | The White Rajahs: a History of Sarawak from 1841 to 1946 |
| Treacher | William Hood | 1891 | British Borneo: sketches of Brunai, Sarawak, Labuan, and North Borneo |

=== Colonial history – Malaya and Singapore ===
| Author Last | Author First | Date | Title |
|---|---|---|---|
| Swettenham | Frank | 1906 | British Malaya |

=== World War 2 history ===
| Author Last | Author First | Date | Title |

=== Postwar modern history ===
| Author Last | Author First | Date | Title |

== Politics and law ==
| Author Last | Author First | Date | Title |

== Travel and tourism ==
| Region | Author | Date | Title |
|---|---|---|---|
| Southeast Asia | George Windsor Earl | 1837 | The Eastern seas; or, Voyages and adventures in the Indian Archipelago, in 1832-33-34, comprising a tour of the island of Java -- visits to Borneo, the Malay Peninsula, Siam &c |
| Sarawak | Anna Brassey | 1887 | The last voyage |
| Singapore & Sarawak | Cuthbert Collingwood | 1868 | Rambles of a naturalist on the shores and waters of the China Sea : being observations in natural history during a voyage to China, Formosa, Borneo, Singapore, etc., made in Her Majesty's vessels in 1866 and 1867 |
| Sarawak | Ida Laura Pfeiffer | 1855 | Lady’s Second Journey Round the World Vol. 1 |
| Sarawak | Frederick Boyle | 1865 | Adventures Among the Dyaks of Borneo |
| Sarawak | Marianne North | 1893 | Recollections of a happy life : being the autobiography of Marianne North Vol. 1 |
