= Foggo (surname) =

Foggo is a surname. Notable people with the surname include:

- Cheryl Foggo (born 1956), Canadian author
- George Foggo (1793–1869), English historical painter; brother of James
- Gregg Foggo (born 1970), Bermudian cricketer
- James Foggo (1789–1860), English historical painter; brother of George
- James G. Foggo III (born 1959), U.S. Navy Vice Admiral, 6th Fleet commander
- Jimmy Foggo, Australian television producer and director
- Ken Foggo (born 1943), Scottish footballer
- Kyle Foggo (born 1954), American intelligence officer involved in the Cunningham scandal
- Mark Foggo (born 1950), English ska musician
- Peter Foggo (1930–1993), British architect
- Samantha Foggo (born 1974), British swimmer
