= Vane Ireton Shaftesbury St John =

English author

Vane Ireton Shaftesbury St John (19 August 1838 - 20 December 1911) was a writer of boys' stories and Penny dreadful popular serial literature.

== Early life ==
Vane Ireton Shaftesbury St John was born in Hampstead, London, the son of journalist, author and traveller James Augustus St. John and his wife, Eliza Hansard. He was the youngest brother of diplomat Spenser St. John, journalist Bayle St. John and travel writer Percy Bolingbroke St. John. He worked as a clerk for the Inland Revenue before taking up writing full time.

== Writing career ==
St. John was a prolific writer of boys' stories. He edited a series of boys' stories named Young Men of Great Britain. Towards the end of the 19th century, he edited the series Pals. He also reportedly wrote anonymously for publications such as The Wild Boys of London.

St. John often found himself struggling to cope with his debts. In 1880, while living in Margate, he pawned all his clothes, and wrapped himself up in a sheet while he wrote his stories.

== Family ==
St. John married Eliza Middleton on 25 April 1857, and they had 11 children between them, but by the time Eliza died in 1874, four had predeceased her. In January 1875, he married Margaret Chilcott, 20 years his junior, and they had 14 children, of which four died in infancy. With his mistress, Mary Ann Barry, he had another four children, who ended up in the workhouse.

== Death ==
St. John died virtually penniless at his home in Peckham on 20 December 1911.
