= Horace Stebbing Roscoe St John =

English author and journalist

- Born: 1832; Normandy
- Died: 29 February 1888 (aged 55–56); Surrey
- Occupations: Author and journalist

Horace Stebbing Roscoe St John (1832 – 29 February 1888) was an English author and journalist.

== Biography ==
St John was the youngest son of James Augustus St. John. He was born in Normandy in 1832 and educated under his father. He began his journalistic career as a boy, and while ‘in a round jacket and turn-down collar’ wrote a leading article for the ‘Sunday Times.’ With his brothers Bayle and Percy Bolingbroke St. John, both of whom are separately noticed, he edited in 1854 ‘Utopia: a political, literary, and industrial journal,’ which only ran to six numbers. For many years he was a leader-writer on political topics on the ‘Daily Telegraph,’ and frequently acted as special correspondent of the ‘Times,’ the ‘Standard,’ and other newspapers. During 1862 and 1863 he was a contributor to the ‘Athenæum,’ to the ‘Seven Days' Journal,’ and to the ‘Leader.’ Falling into pecuniary difficulties, he was, on his own petition, made a bankrupt on 9 January 1862, and received a conditional order of discharge on 11 April 1862.

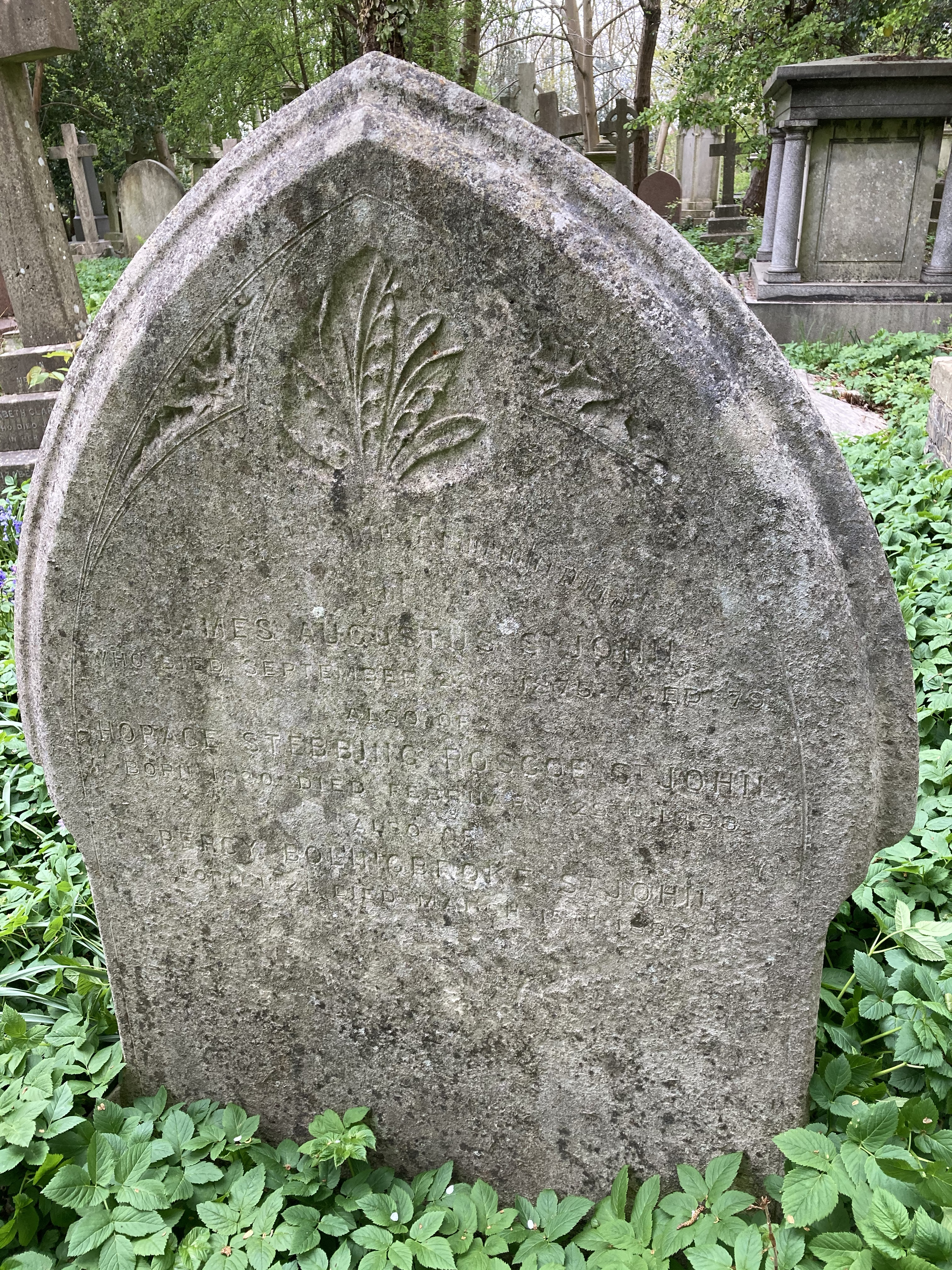
St John family grave in Highgate Cemetery

He died at 49 Sydenham Place, Anerley, Surrey, on 29 February 1888 and was buried in the St John family grave on the western side of Highgate Cemetery.

He was the author of:

- ‘A Life of Christopher Columbus,’ 1850.
- ‘History of the British Conquests in India,’ 1852, 2 vols.
- ‘The Indian Archipelago: its History and Present State,’ 1853, 2 vols.

His wife, a daughter of Thomas Roscoe, was author of:

- ‘Audubon the Naturalist in the New World: his Adventures and Discoveries,’ 1856; new edit., revised, Boston, 1856.
- ‘Englishwomen and the Age,’ 1860.
- ‘Masaniello of Naples: the Record of a Nine Days' Revolution,’ 1865.
- ‘The Court of Anna Carafa: an historical narrative,’ 1872.
