= MySpace Road Tour =

2008 online reality series created and produced by Myspace Australia

- Created by: Chris Culvenor Jimmy Foggo
- Presented by: Jabba (presenter)
- Country of origin: Australia
- No. of seasons: 1
- No. of episodes: 20

Production
- Executive producer: Chris Culvenor
- Producer: Jimmy Foggo Alexis Tarren
- Editor: James Ingram Colin Dawson
- Camera setup: Shing Fung Cheung
- Running time: Varies
- Production company: FremantleMedia Australia

Original release
- Network: Myspace
- Release: 1 September – 15 October 2008

MySpace Road Tour was an original online reality series created and produced for Myspace Australia by production company Fremantle Limited. The series was hosted by television and radio personality Jabba and documented a cross-country journey to visit and profile MySpace Australia's 10 most extraordinary users.

The series was sponsored by Just Car Insurance and Intel and ran from July to October 2008. It was nominated in the 2009 Australian Interactive Media Industry Association Awards for Best Use of Social Media.

During MipCom in October 2008, Myspace announced plans for a second series and indicated that it was in talks with cable network Foxtel to distribute series one on television. Myspace also commented on plans to produce other versions of the MySpace Road Tour in other countries.

The format was created by FremantleMedia Director of Digital Media Chris Culvenor and Digital Producer Jimmy Foggo.

== Entry process ==
In July 2008 the Australian Myspace community was invited to enter via the MySpace Road Tour entry page over a three-week period.

To enter users had to submit a photo from their Myspace album, submit their Myspace profile address and write a short answer to the questions "What makes you extraordinary?" & "What extraordinary present would you buy with $10,000?" Myspace and FremantleMedia then selected the top 10 contestants.

== The series ==
In September 2008, Jabba traveled across Australia in a bright blue kombi and profiled each of the 10 contestants. Each episode, focusing on one of the contestants, was 5 to 8 minutes in duration. At the end of each episode, Jabba asked the contestant, "What extraordinary present would they buy with the $10,000 prize?"

In addition to the 10 feature episodes available on the MySpace website, users could also watch bonus content including outtake footage and "Jabba Challenge Episodes" that featured the host carrying out comedic challenges in remote Australian destinations. The challenges were:

- Jabba trying to sell an opal in the outback town of Lightning Ridge.
- Jabba dressed up in a Star Wars costume while crossing the Tasman Sea on the Spirit of Tasmania.
- Jabba getting Baz Luhrmann's help creating a cinematic trailer for 'Road Tour - The Movie'.

== Voting and the winner ==
At the end of the Tour, after the final episode was posted, the entire MySpace community was invited to vote for their favorite "extraordinary contestant" via a voting application on the official MySpace Road Tour Profile Page, available for two weeks.

The winner was Skarlett Saramore, the MySpace obsessed pan-sexual metal drummer from Abbotsford, New South Wales who played in the band Chaingang.

== Contestants ==
Mick Pylak	Star Wars Fanatic, Campbelltown, New South Wales
Skarlett Saramore	MySpace Obsessed Metal Drummer, Abbotsford, New South Wales
Queen Miss Left Titter	Drag Queen Puppet, Miranda, New South Wales
Wednesday de Avaric	Gothic Burlesque Performer, Auchenflower, Queensland
Jimbo Bazoobi	Outback Nomadic Comedian, Grawin, New South Wales
Bruce Johnstone	Transvestite Speedway Racer, Geraldton, Western Australia
Renee Cassar	MySpace Australia's #1 Unsigner Artist Racer, Werribee, Victoria
Donny Pelsoczy	Teacher, Father and Rapper, Murrumbeena, Victoria
Hannah Coates	Upcoming Fashion Designer, Shearwater, Tasmania
Christian Hermes	Pro Wrestler, Manly, New South Wales
