= Thomas Roscoe =

English author and translator (1791–1871)

Thomas Roscoe (Liverpool 23 June 1791 – 24 September 1871 London) was an English author and translator.

== Life ==
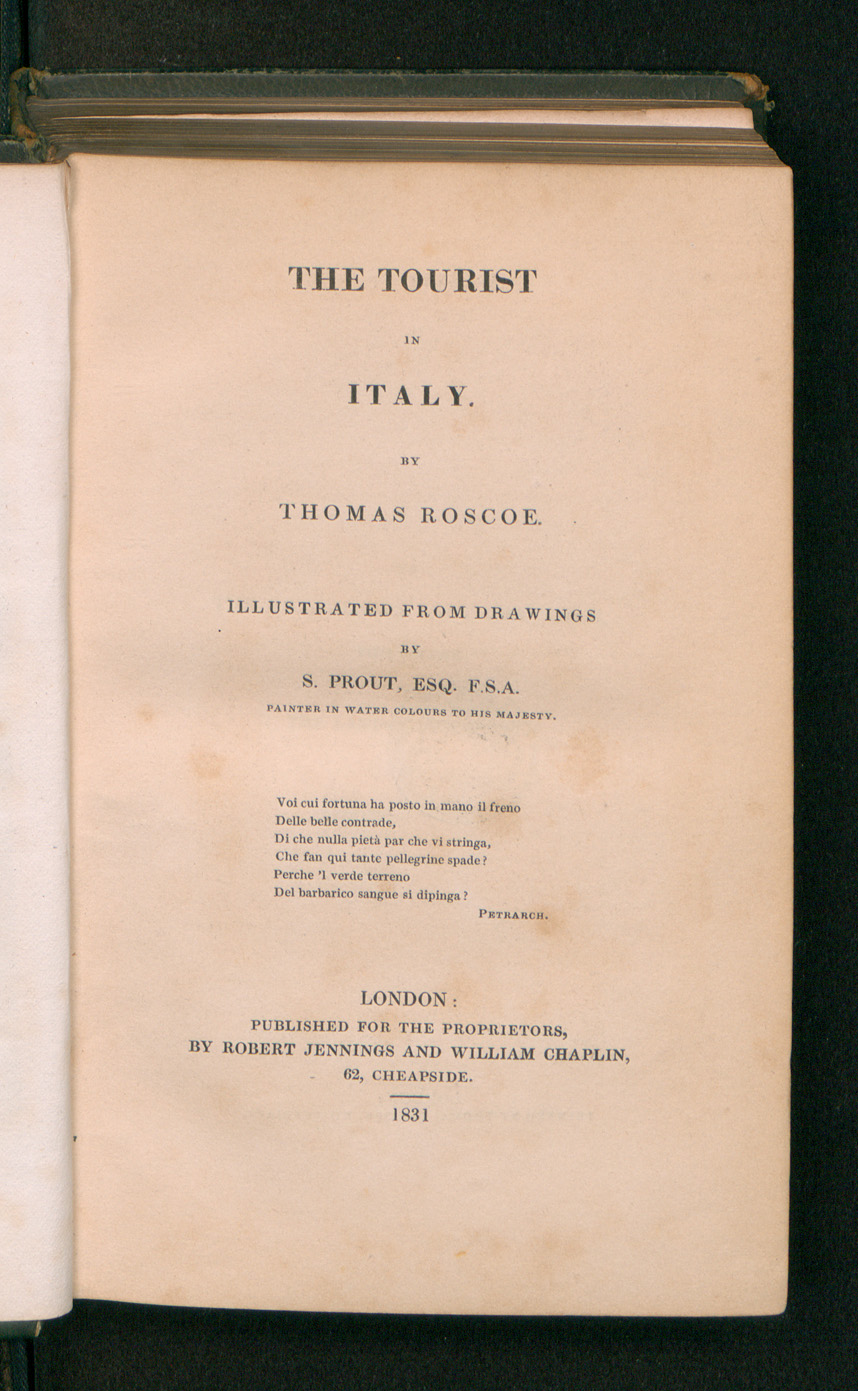
Tourist in Italy, 1831

The fifth son of William Roscoe, he was born in Toxteth Park, Liverpool in 1791, and educated by Dr. W. Shepherd and by Mr. Lloyd, a private tutor.

Soon after his father's financial troubles in 1816, which led to bankruptcy, Roscoe began to write in local magazines and journals, and he continued to follow literature as a profession. He died at age 80, on 24 September 1871, at Acacia Road, St. John's Wood, London.

== Works ==
Roscoe's major original works were:

- Gonzalo, the Traitor: a Tragedy, 1820.
- The King of the Peak [anon.], 1823, 3 vols.
- Owain Goch: a Tale of the Revolution [anon.], 1827, 3 vols.
- The Tourist in Switzerland and Italy, 1830; the first volume of the Landscape Annual, followed for eight years by similar volumes on Italy, France, and Spain.
- Wanderings and Excursions in North Wales, 1836.
- Wanderings in South Wales, with Louisa Anne Twamley the naturalist, 1837.
- The London and Birmingham Railway, 1839. with illustrations from George Dodgson, William Radclyffe, Edward Radclyffe and others
- Book of the Grand Junction Railway, 1839 (the last two were issued together as the Illustrated History of the London and North-Western Railway).
- Miguel De Cervantes Saavedra, 1839 London Thomas Tegg
- Legends of Venice, 1841.
- Belgium in a Picturesque Tour, 1841.
- A Summer Tour in the Isle of Wight, 1843.
- Life of William the Conqueror, 1846.
- The Last of the Abencerages, and other Poems, 1850.
- The Fall of Granada.

Roscoe's translations were:

- The Memoirs of Benvenuto Cellini, 1822.
- Jean Charles Léonard de Sismondi, Literature of the South of Europe, 1823, 4 vols. Roscoe's annotations helped make the work popular.
- Italian Novelists, 1825, 4 vols.
- German Novelists, 1826, 4 vols.
- Spanish Novelists, 1832, 3 vols.
- Louis Joseph Antoine de Potter, Memoirs of Scipio de Ricci, 1828, 2 vols.
- Luigi Lanzi, History of Painting in Italy, 1828, 6 vols.
- Silvio Pellico, Imprisonments, 1833.
- Pellico, Duties of Men, 1834.
- Martín Fernández de Navarrete, Life of Cervantes, 1839 (in Murray's Family Library).
- Johann Georg Kohl, Travels in England, 1845.

Roscoe edited The Juvenile Keepsake, 1828–30; The Novelists' Library, with Biographical and Critical Notices, 1831–3, 17 vols.; the works of Henry Fielding, Tobias Smollett, and Jonathan Swift (1840–9, 3 vols.), and new issues of his father's Lorenzo de' Medici and Leo the Tenth.

== Family ==
Roscoe married, or cohabited with, Elizabeth Edwards, and had seven children, including Jane Elizabeth St John, writer and wife of Horace Stebbing Roscoe St John.

== Notes ==
Attribution

This article incorporates text from a publication now in the public domain: Lee, Sidney, ed. (1897). "Roscoe, Thomas". Dictionary of National Biography. Vol. 49. London: Smith, Elder & Co.
