= Boophis idae =

Conservation status
- Least Concern (IUCN 3.1)

Scientific classification
- Kingdom: Animalia
- Phylum: Chordata
- Class: Amphibia
- Order: Anura
- Family: Mantellidae
- Genus: Boophis
- Species: B. idae

Binomial name
- Boophis idae (Steindachner, 1867)

Synonyms
- Boophis hillenii Blommers-Schlösser, 1979

Species of frog

Boophis idae, also known commonly as Ida's bright-eyed frog, is a species of frog in the family Mantellidae. The species is endemic to Madagascar.

== Etymology ==
The specific name, idae, is in honor of Austrian explorer Ida Laura Pfeiffer.

== Geographic range and habitat ==
B. idae is widely distributed in the eastern moist lowland and montane rainforests of Madagascar, from Nosy Boraha south to Ivohibe, at altitudes of 900–1,100 m (3,000–3,600 ft). It also frequents swamps, marshes, and a variety of humid habitats in human use. It appears to be locally common throughout its range.

== Conservation ==
Although the species B. idae is currently classified as "Least Concern" by the IUCN, it is thought to be impacted by habitat loss due to agriculture, timber extraction, charcoal manufacture, and the spread of invasive species such as eucalypts.
