= Jimmy Foggo =

Australian TV producer and director

Jimmy Foggo is a BAFTA-winning Australian TV producer and director. Since 2016 he has held the role of head of development at Eureka Productions being involved in the commission and production of The Chefs' Line for SBS and Behave Yourself! for Seven Network. During his five-year tenure in the UK, Foggo produced the BAFTA award-winning series 4 of Made in Chelsea directed MasterChef: The Professionals, was the Senior Digital Producer for Shine TV and was a judge for the 2010 BAFTA New Media Awards. Upon his return to Australia in 2013, Foggo produced and directed series 3 & 4 of River Cottage Australia broadcast on Foxtel and SBS, and taught the Shooter Producer Short Course at AFTRS - the Australian Television and Radio School from 2014 to 2016.

Foggo was the co-creator and director-producer of the 2008 reality television series MySpace Road Tour. In 2007 Foggo was the director of photography and associate producer for the observational documentary Christmas Lights with his wife, Elizabeth Fisher, for ABC and sold around the world.
