= James Foggo =

English painter

James Foggo (1789–1860) was an English historical painter.

== Early life ==
Foggo was born in London on 11 June 1789. His father, James Foggo, a native of Fife, was a watchmaker of good repute and an advanced republican. He strenuously advocated negro emancipation in repeated visits to North and South America. Towards the end of 1799 the free assertion of these principles led him to fear persecution, and he took refuge in France with his wife and children. Unfortunately the Foggos arrived just at the commencement of Napoleon's military despotism, and were unable to quit Paris and return to their native land as they desired. James and his younger brother George Foggo, wishing to become painters, were placed in the academy at Paris under the instruction of Jean Baptiste Regnault.

== Career ==
The brothers became desirous of emulating the work done, under the encouragement of their country, by the French historical painters. In 1815, on Napoleon's return from Elba, Foggo quit France for England, where he found all the friends of his family dead or dispersed. He set up a studio in Frith Street, Soho. In 1816 he exhibited Jane Shore at the Royal Academy, and in 1818 Hagar and Ishmael at the British Institution, contributing also to the latter a study of An Assassin's Head. The picture of 'Hagar' was well hung, and attracted attention, but did not find a purchaser. Foggo was obliged to support himself by teaching, and occasionally painting portraits. In 1819 his father had to go on a journey to Brazil, and his mother, with his brother George, joined him in London.

From this time for forty years the two brothers lived and worked together, painting on the same canvas, and devoting themselves to historical compositions. They spent about three years in painting a very large picture, representing The Christian Inhabitants of Parga preparing to emigrate. This, when completed, was too large for exhibition in the ordinary galleries, and the Foggos were compelled to exhibit it separately at their own expense. They were forced to eke out their means by all kinds of artistic drudgery. By sketching in accessories to architectural and sculptural designs they became acquainted with Francis Goodwin, the architect, who advised them to paint pictures suitable for altar-pieces in churches. They subsequently produced The Pool of Bethesda for the Bordesley Chapel at Birmingham; Christ blessing little Children for St. Leonard's Church, Bilston; Christ confounding the Rulers of the Synagogue, exhibited at the Royal Academy, and much admired, but mysteriously lost on its way to Manchester, for which town it was destined; Nathan reproving David for Macclesfield town hall, and The Entombment of Christ, presented by Edward Moxhay to the French Protestant church, St. Martin's-le-Grand.

The brothers lost patronage by their open advocacy of a more liberal system of education in art than that provided by the Academy. They were unsuccessful competitors at the Westminster Hall exhibitions in 1843–7, but exhibited their works with Benjamin Haydon and others at the Pantheon. Among other historical pictures painted by them were: The Martyrdom of Anne Askew, Wat Tyler killing the Tax Collector, The Barons taking the Oath at Bury St. Edmunds, Napoleon signing the Death-warrant of the Duc d'Enghien, General Williams among the Inhabitants of Kars, &c.

In 1852 they undertook the arrangement and care of the exhibition at the Pantheon in Oxford Street, and continued it for three years. Mr. Hart, a well-known picture dealer, offered to purchase all the unsold works which the Foggos had by them. The offer, gladly accepted, came to nothing, owing to the premature death of the purchaser. The brothers were much esteemed in private life for many excellent qualities, and their friends were numerous and sincere.

== Death ==
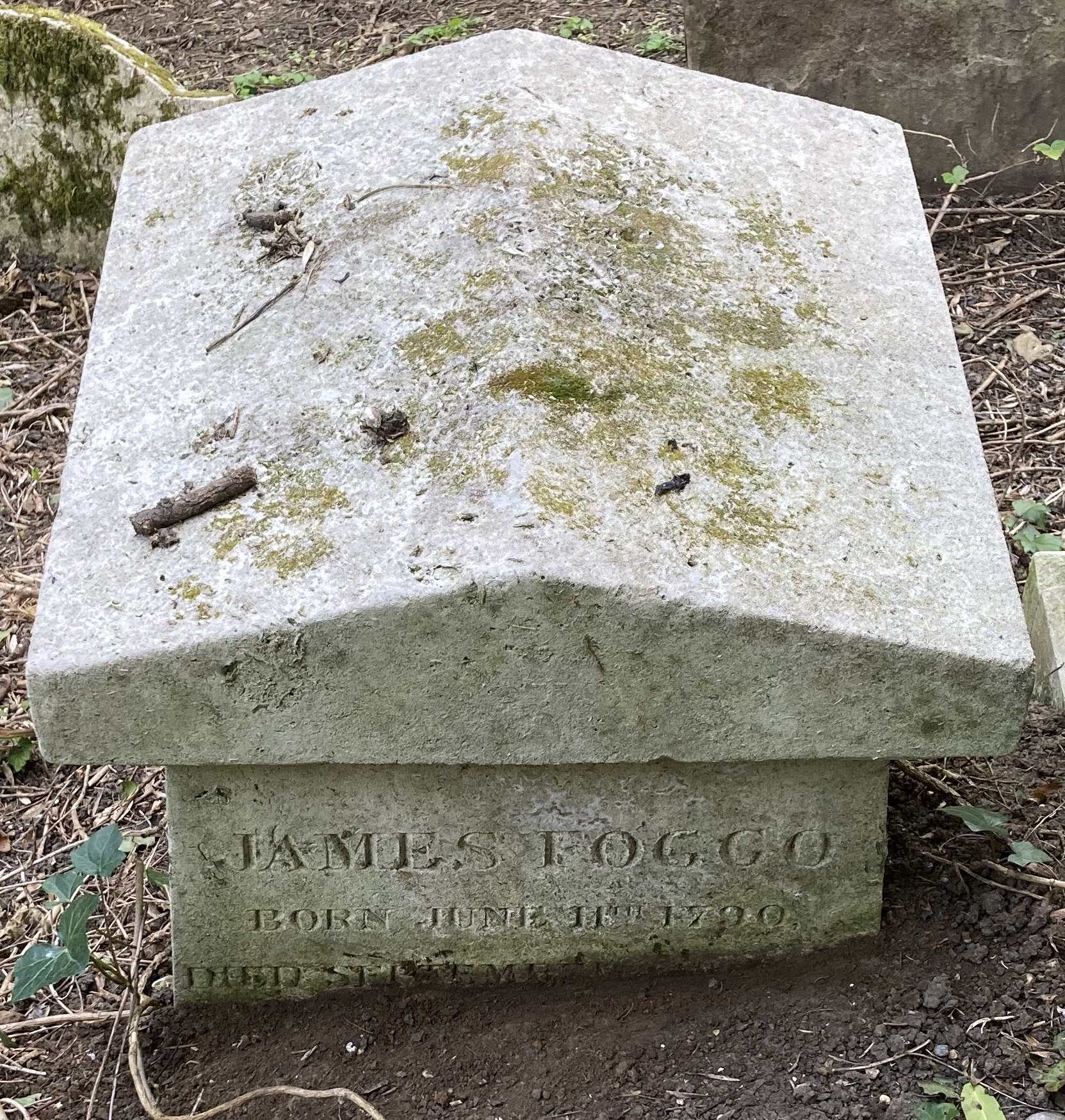
Grave of James Foggo in Highgate Cemetery

Foggo died in London on the 14th September 1860, and was buried on the west side of Highgate Cemetery. His grave memorial incorrectly records his year of birth as 1790, however the parish register of St James, Clerkenwell, where he was baptised on the 3rd July 1789, states his date of birth as 11 June 1789.

== Gallery ==
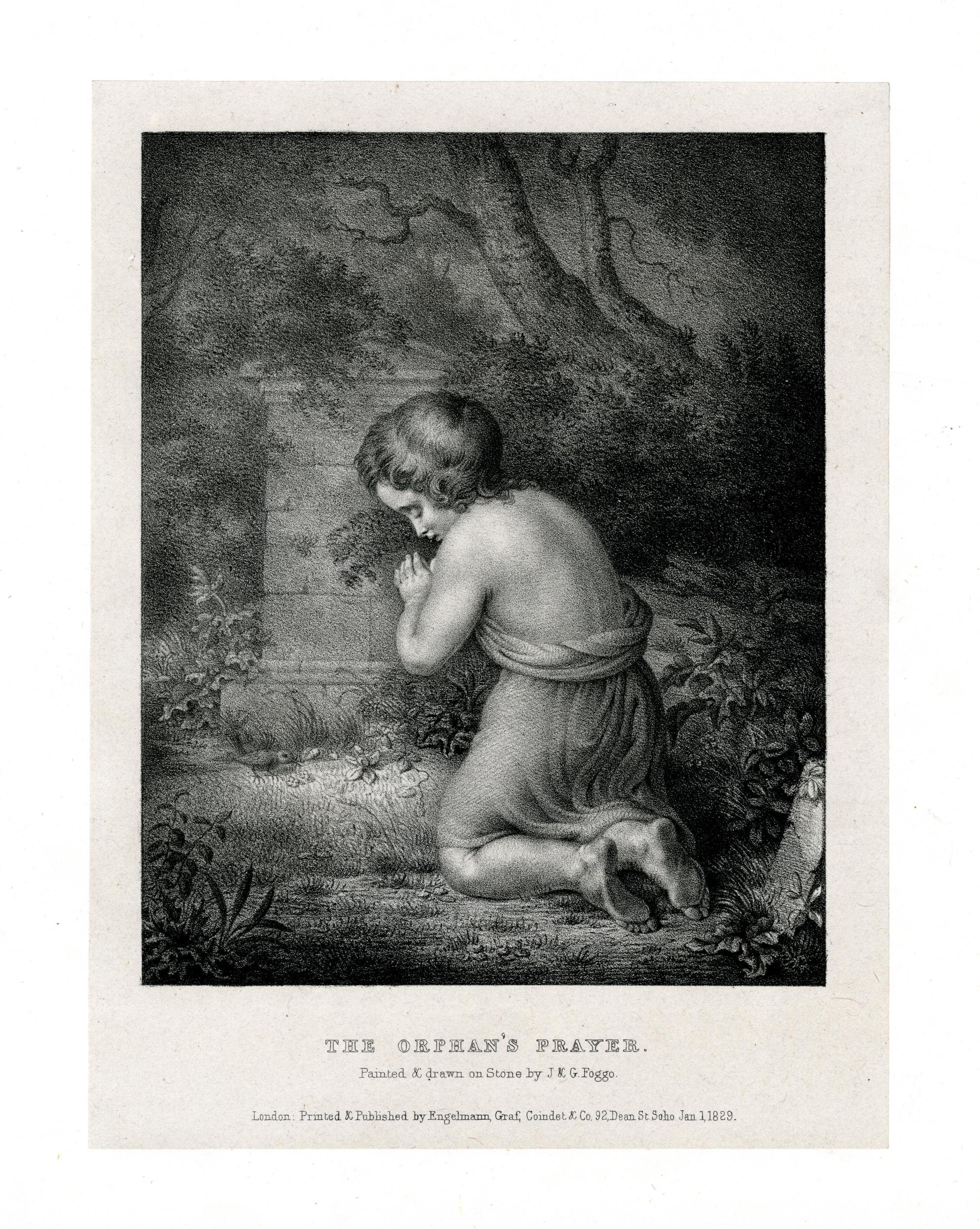
The Orphan's Prayer 1829 Lithograph on chine collé, British Museum

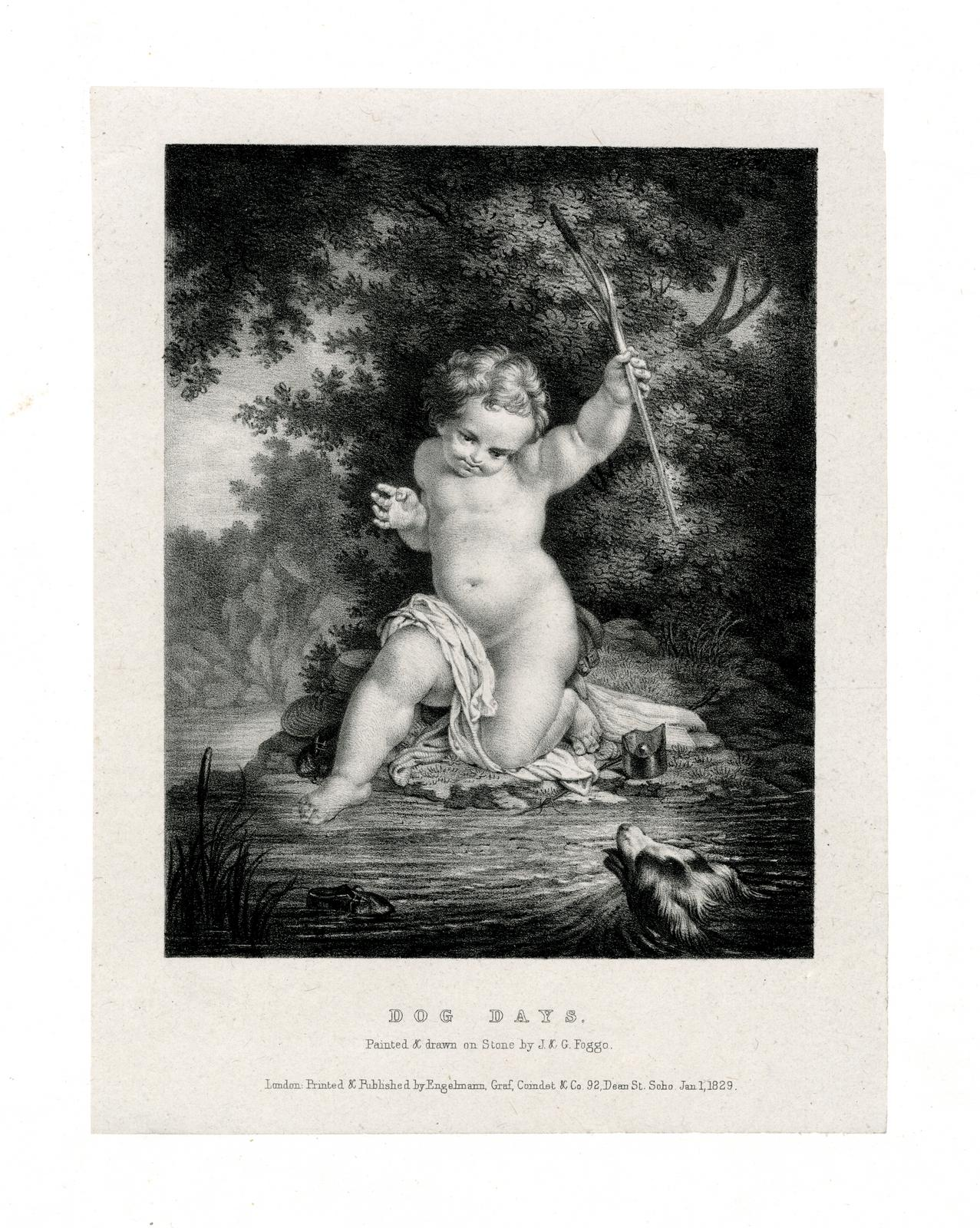
Dog Days 1829 Lithograph on chine collé, British Museum
