= Percy Bolingbroke St John =

English journalist (1821–1889)

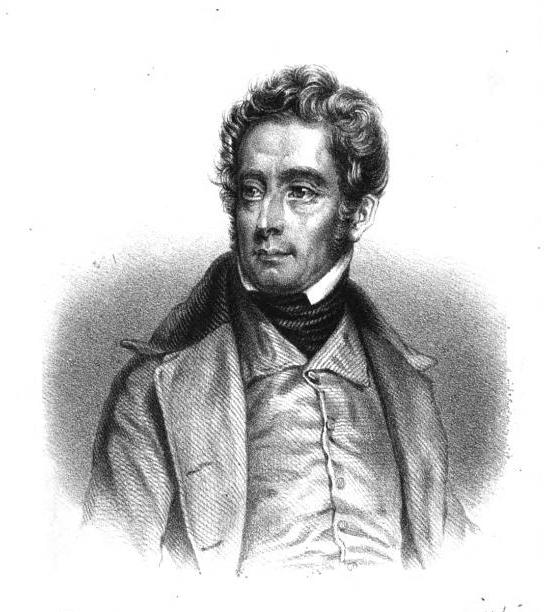
Percy Bolingbroke St John

Percy Bolingbroke St John (4 March 1821 – 1889) was an English journalist and author.

== Early life ==
Percy St. John was the eldest son of James Augustus St John. He was born in Plymouth, in Devon, and probably raised in Camden Town. He accompanied his father on some of his travels, particularly to Madrid for research, and he also travelled in America.

== Career ==
In the United States, Percy St. John wrote several books and articles under various pseudonyms.

In 1838, he published The Young Naturalist's Book of Birds: Anecdotes of the Feathered Creation. A year later, he wrote his first work of fiction, which appeared in the Chamber's Journal, followed by further stories in Ainsworth Magazine and Bentley's Miscellany. In 1845, he published the novel The Trapper's Bride – A Tale of the Rocky Mountains.

In 1846, Percy St. John was appointed the Paris correspondent for the Glasgow newspaper the North British Daily Mail. That year, St. John edited the Mirror of Literature, and in 1861 the London Herald. As correspondent to various newspapers, his miscellaneous contributions to the press were numerous; and he was also a frequent contributor of papers to Chambers's Journal and other magazines.

In 1858, he launched the Guide to Literature, Science, Art, and General Information, but it only ran for one year. From 1863 onwards, he became well-known as a writer for boys' papers. Amongst his pseudonyms were Captain Flack, Paul Periwinkle, Henry L. Boone, Warren St John, Harry Cavendish and J.T. Brougham.

Between 1883-5, Percy St. John edited the first five volumes of Dicks' English Library of Standard Works.

Despite some successes, Percy St. John was often short of money, and he had to apply to the Royal Literary Fund for support, receiving grants in 1855 of £30, and in 1874 and 1879 of £60 each.

== Marriages ==
In 1841, Percy St. John's married Mary Agar Hansard, but it was illegal, because she was his aunt, being his mother's sister. In 1845, their son, Oliver Cromwell St. John, was born.

According to the 1851 census, Mary was residing in England with Oliver, while Percy lived in Paris, so the marriage may have been annulled. Mary died on 16 February 1895, at the age of 88.

In 1852, Percy St. John re-married, his second wife being Frances Deane, with whom he had two further children.

== Death ==
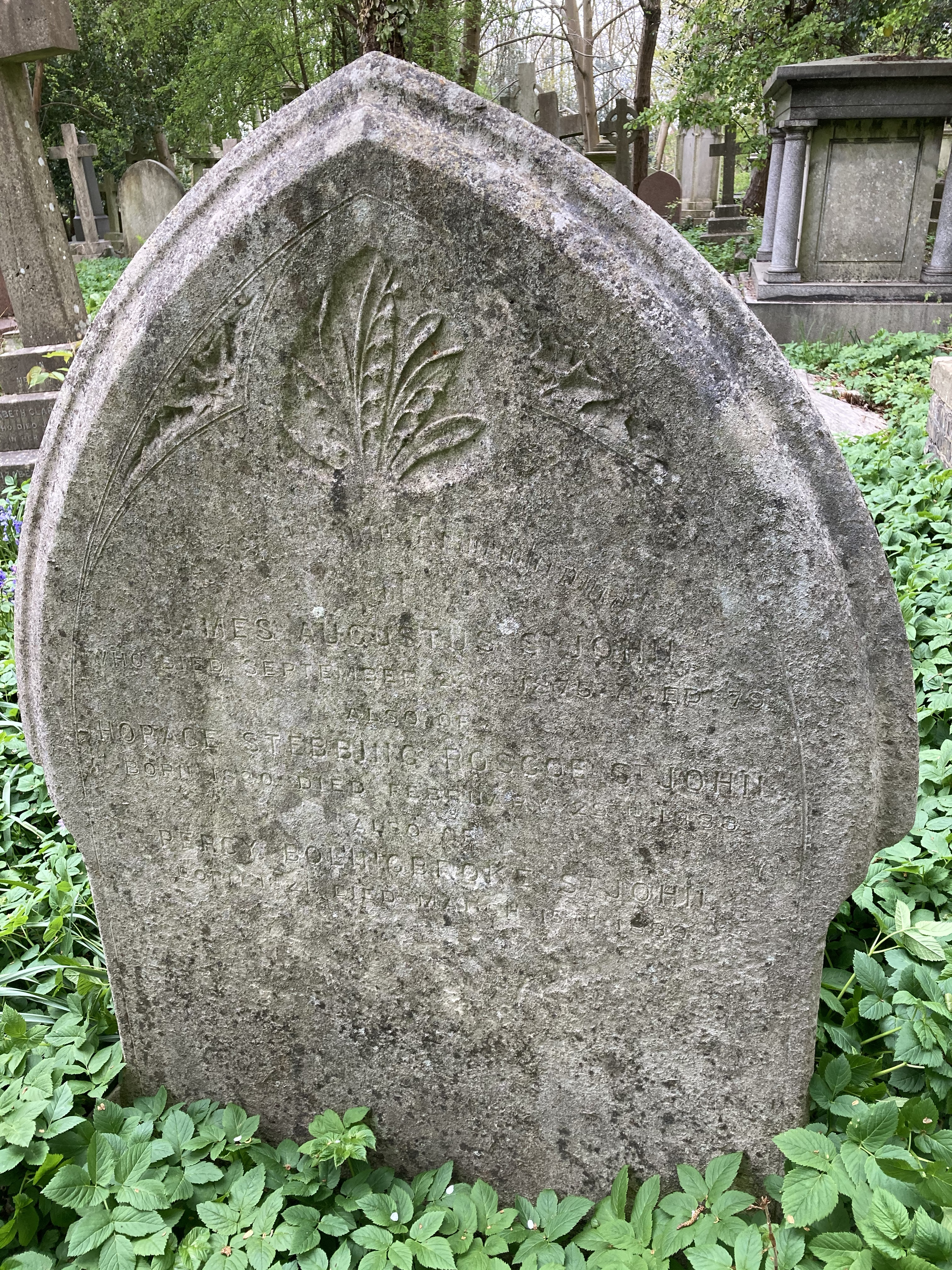
St John family grave in Highgate Cemetery

St John died in a lodging-house in London on 15 March 1889 and was buried alongside his father and his brother, Horace Stebbing Roscoe, in Highgate Cemetery in north London.

== Works ==
St John began to write tales when still young, and translated about thirty of Gustave Aimard's Indian tales into English. His translations appeared between 1876 and 1879. His original works included:

- Young Naturalist's Book of Birds, London, 1838.
- Trapper's Bride; and Indian Tales, London, 1845; several subsequent editions.
- French revolution in 1848: The three days of February, 1848; with sketches of Lamartine, Guizot, etc., 1848.
- Paul Peabody, London, 1853 (incomplete); another edit. London, 1865.
- Our Holiday: a Week in Paris, London, 1854.
- Lobster Salad (with Edward Copping), London, 1855.
- Quadroona, or the Slave Mother, London, 1861.
- The Red Queen, London, 1863.
- Snow Ship (adventures of Canadian emigrants), London, 1867; various editions subsequently.
- The Young Buccaneer, London, 1873.
- The North Pole (a narrative of Arctic explorations), London, 1875.
- Polar Crusoes, London, 1876.
- The Sailor Crusoe, London, 1876.
- The Arctic Crusoe, A Tale of the Polar Sea; or, Arctic Adventures on the Sea of Ice, 1854

He wrote a Dick Turpin novel, The Blue Dwarf (1869), and a serial under the same title in 1874–5.

== Notes ==
Attribution

This article incorporates text from a publication now in the public domain: Lee, Sidney, ed. (1897). "St. John, Percy Bolingbroke". Dictionary of National Biography. Vol. 50. London: Smith, Elder & Co.
