= John Charles Templer =

British lawyer

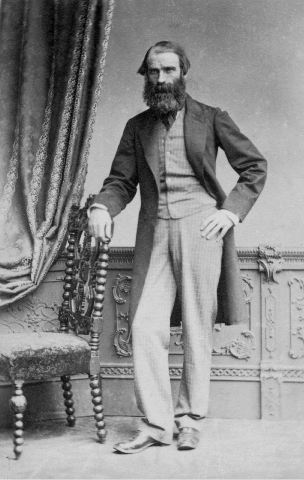
John Charles Templer

John Charles Templer (1814–1874) was an English barrister.

== Life ==
Born in Bridport, he was the son of James Templer (1787–1858), a lawyer, and his wife Catharine Lethbridge. He was educated at Westminster School, and entered Trinity College, Cambridge in 1832, graduating with a B.A. in 1836. He was admitted to the Inner Temple in 1837.

In a voter qualification case related to 1845, Temple is described as a special pleader, living with his wife in Greenwich. By 1847, he was serving in the Royal Navy, as evidenced by newspaper reports of his second son, John Harvey.

Templer became a close friend of James Brooke through his elder brother, James Lethbridge Templer (1811–1845), of the East India Company Merchant Navy. James Templer commanded the Minerva (Bombay, 1812) on a tea voyage to China in 1835–6, for his uncle Henry Templer who was its recent owner, and Brooke came on the journey. John Templer and Brooke were corresponding by 1840. Templer acted as Brooke's legal counsel. He went on to support Brooke as an apologist, and asked Harriet Martineau for her advocacy.

In 1853, Templer was called to the bar, and from 1854, he was one of the Masters of the Court of Exchequer. He was also one of the founding directors of the Borneo Company in 1856. The company's initial finance was largely from directors and staff of W. R. Paterson & Co., with Robert Henderson. Templer took a 5% stake, and acted as the company's deputy chairman, also representing Brooke in London.

== Works ==
Templer edited three volumes of James Brooke's letters for publication in 1853. He also edited the Poems of his brother James Lethbridge, and published them in 1872.

== Family ==
Templer married Hannah Frances Gordon, elder daughter of Sir James Gordon RN, in 1842.
