= James Augustus St. John =

British writer (1795–1875)

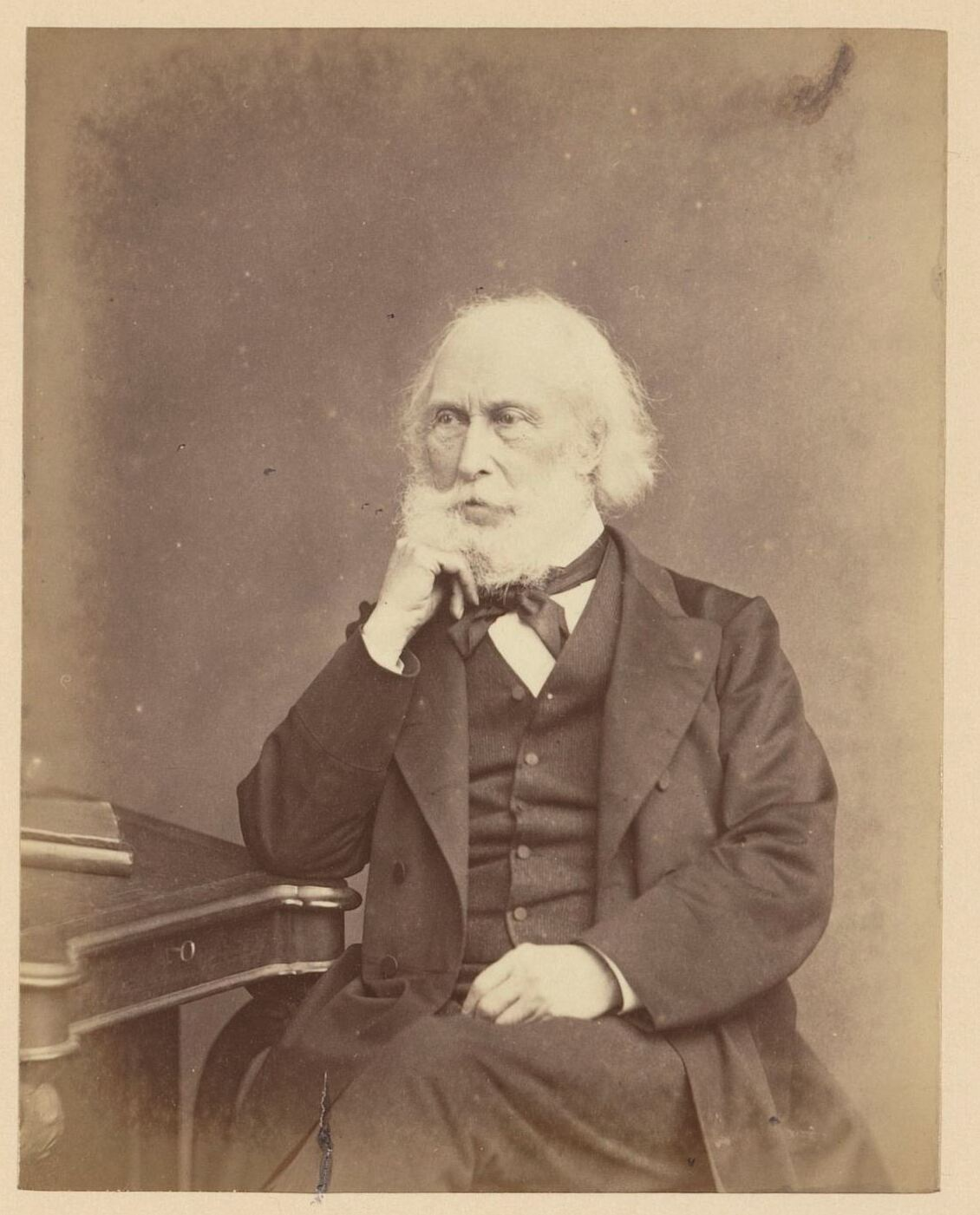
Portrait by Ernest Edwards

James Augustus St. John (24 September 1795 – 22 September 1875) was a British journalist, writer, and traveller.

== Life in Wales ==
James was born in Laugharne, Carmarthenshire, Wales, the son of Gelly John, a shoemaker. He went to the Laugharne charity school until his father died in 1802 after which he received instruction from a local clergyman, eventually mastering the classics, and acquiring proficiency in French, Italian, Spanish, Arabic and Persian. As James John, his baptismal name, he became involved in radical politics. He had to leave Laugharne to avoid arrest, after writing what the authorities deemed to be a seditious pamphlet.

== Career in England ==
Under the name of Julian Augustus St John he went to London, where he obtained the post of deputy editor of Richard Carlile's radical newspaper The Republican. In 1819, shortly after the Peterloo Massacre, Carlile was imprisoned and St. John briefly took over his role as editor. That year, he married Eliza Hansard, and officially changed his name to James Augustus St. John to avoid recognition.

He obtained a connection with a Plymouth-based newspaper, and when, in 1824, James Silk Buckingham started the Oriental Herald, St. John became assistant editor. In 1827, together with D. L. Richardson, he founded the London Weekly Review, subsequently purchased by Colburn and transformed into the Court Journal. He lived for some years on the Continent and went in 1832 to Egypt and Nubia, travelling mostly on foot. The results of his journey were published under the titles Egypt and Mohammed Ali, or Travels in the Valley of the Nile (2 vols., 1834), Egypt and Nubia (1844), and Isis, an Egyptian Pilgrimage (2 vols., 1853). On his return he settled in London, and for many years wrote political leaders for the Daily Telegraph and, under the pseudonym of Greville Brooke, a column in the Sunday Times. In 1868 he published a Life of Sir Walter Raleigh, based on researches in the archives at Madrid and elsewhere.

When James moved to England, he befriended Percy Bysshe Shelley, whom he greatly admired. In 1828, while editor of the London Weekly Review, he published a poem he claimed was written by Shelley, "To the Queen of My Heart". Experts now believe that James actually wrote the poem, and claimed it was Shelley's, as a hoax.

== Death ==
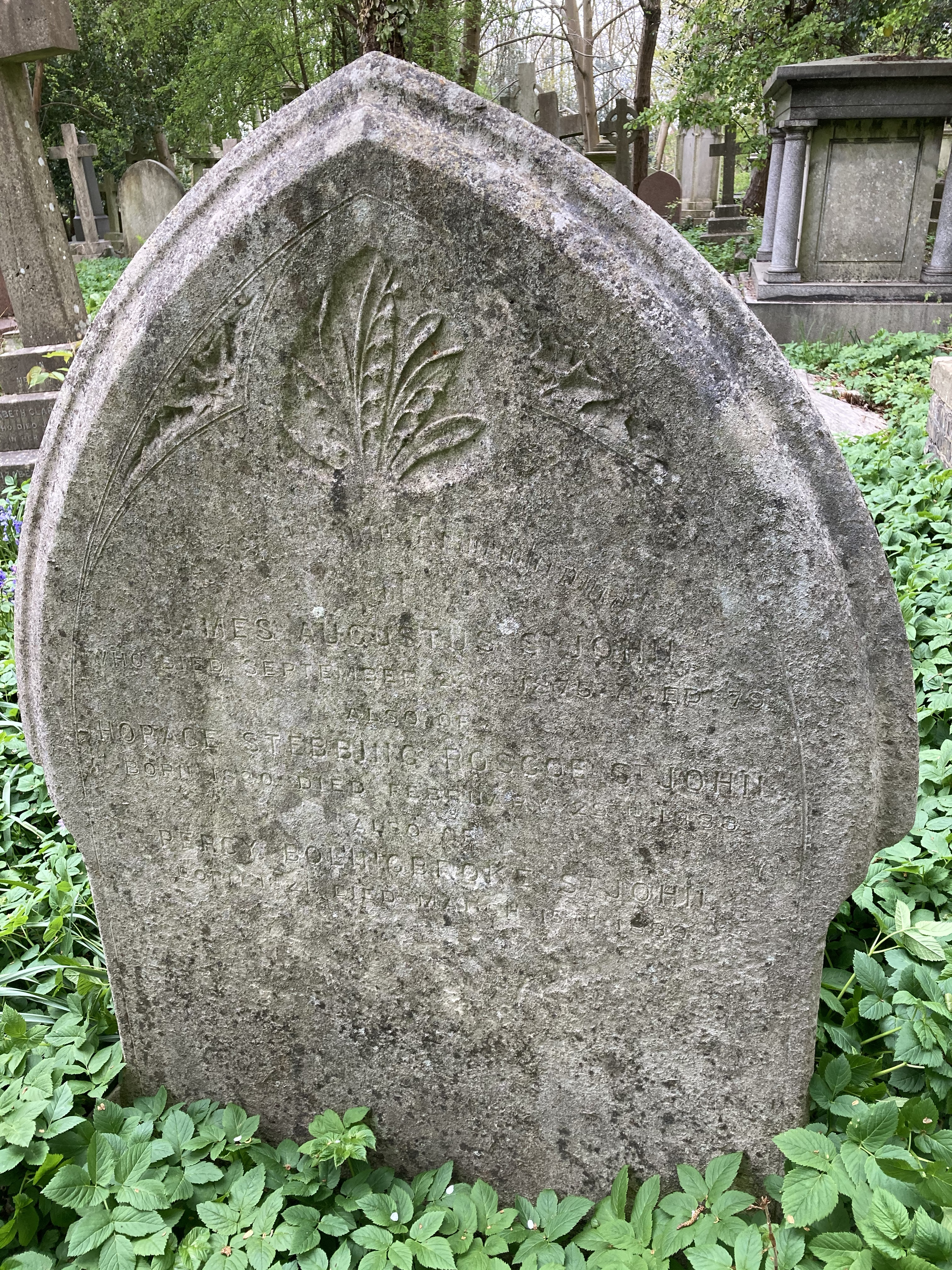
St John family grave in Highgate Cemetery

On the 22 September 1875, James Augustus St. John died in relative poverty in London and was buried in Highgate Cemetery. His sons Horace Stebbing Roscoe and Percy Bolingbroke were later buried in the same grave.

== Works ==
Under the pseudonym of Horace Gwynne he wrote Abdallah; an oriental poem: in three cantos (1824). Under the name of St. John, besides the works mentioned above, he was also the author of Journal of a Residence in Normandy (1830); Lives of Celebrated Travellers (1830); Anatomy of Society (1831); History, Manners and Customs of the Hindus (1831); Margaret Ravenscroft, or Second Love (3 vols., 1835); Select Prose Works of Milton (2 vols. 1836);The History of the Manners and Customs of Ancient Greece (3 vols. 1842); Sir Cosmo Digby, a novel (1843); Views in the Eastern Archipelago (1847); Oriental album. Characters, costumes, and modes of life, in the valley of the Nile (1848); Oriental album... (2nd ed.) (1851); Isis: An Egyptian Pilgrimage (1853); There and Back Again in Search of Beauty (1853); The Nemesis of Power (1854); Philosophy at the Foot of the Cross (1854); The Preaching of Christ (1855); The Ring and the Veil, a novel (1856); Life of Louis Napoleon (1857); History of the Four Conquests of England (1862); and Weighed in the Balance, a novel (1864). He also edited, with notes, various English classics.

== Family ==
Late in 1819, he married Eliza Caroline Agar Hansard (c.1798–1867), daughter of Alexander Hansard, a Bristol doctor. Among their children were:

- Percy Bolingbroke St. John (1821–1889)
- Bayle St. John (1822–1859)
- Elizabeth Ann St.John (1824–?)
- Spenser St. John (1826–1910)
- James Augustus St.John (1829–1880)
- Horace Stebbing Roscoe St. John (1830–1888)
- Helen Cornelia St.John (1831–1858)
- Vane Ireton Shaftesbury St John (1838–1911)

Percy, Bayle, and Horace all became journalists and authors of some literary distinction.

Bayle began contributing to periodicals when only thirteen, and went on to be a prolific travel writer and biographer.

Horace Stebbing St. John was born in Normandy on 6 July 1830, and was educated by his father. When he was only 20, Horace published A Life of Christopher Columbus. In 1852, he published A History of the British Conquests in India. Between 1857 and 1861, he wrote for the Telegraph, and contributed to other periodicals on politics and Eastern affairs. In 1861, he worked for the Morning Chronicle. However, like so many members of the St. John family, Horace acquired substantial debts, and filed for bankruptcy. He published very little after 1872, suffering from ill health, and he died on 29 February 1888.

Spenser also wrote, but distinguished himself as a diplomat, at first in Labuan, Borneo, where James also went to work for the Brooke Raj in Sarawak.

== In Literature ==
James Augustus St. John is mentioned in 'Flashman on the March' by George MacDonald Fraser as an authority on female breasts.
