= Bayle St. John =

Bayle Frederick St. John (1822–1 August 1859) was a British travel writer and biographer, one of the four sons of James Augustus St. John, who went on to become journalists and authors of some literary distinction.

== Early life ==
Bayle St. John began contributing to periodicals when only thirteen, and when twenty he wrote a series of papers for Fraser under the title De re vehiculari, or a Comic History of Chariots. To the same magazine he contributed a series of essays on Montaigne, and in 1857 he published Montaigne the Essayist, a Biography, in four volumes.

== Writing career ==
Bayle St. John contributed to several periodicals, including the London Journal, The Sunday Times, the Penny Magazine and the Foreign Quarterly Review, which later merged with The Westminster Review. His first full-length publication was The Eccentric Lover, a novel published in 1845. In 1848, he settled in Paris, where he worked as the Paris correspondent for the Daily Telegraph.

During a residence of two years in Egypt he wrote The Libyan Desert (1849), and while in Egypt he learnt Arabic and visited the oasis of Siwa. In Paris, he published Two Years in a Levantine Family (1850) and Views in the Oasis of Siwah (1850).

After a second visit to the East he published Village Life in Egypt (1852); Purple Tints of Paris; Characters and Manners in the New Empire (1854); The Louvre, or Biography of a Museum (1855); The Subalpine Kingdom, or Experiences and Studies in Savoy (1856); Travels of an Arab Merchant in the Soudan (1854); Maretimo, a Story of Adventure (1856); and Memoirs of the Duke of Saint-Simon in the Reign of Louis XIV (four vols., 1857).

== Death ==
In 1858, Bayle St. John returned to England, suffering from ill health. He died on 1 August 1859, at his home in St John's Wood in London.

He left a widow and two sons, and was buried at Kensal Green Cemetery, London.
