= Ida Laura Pfeiffer =

Austrian explorer and writer, editor (1797–1858)

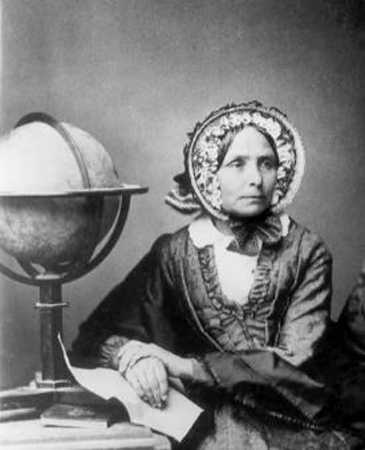
- Ida Pfeiffer, photographed by Franz Hanfstaengl
- Born: Ida Laura Reyer; October 14, 1797; Vienna, Habsburg monarchy
- Died: October 27, 1858 (aged 61); Vienna, Austrian Empire
- Occupations: Explorer, travel writer, ethnographer
- Known for: Global travel; travel writing; two circumnavigations of the world
- Spouse: Mark Anton Pfeiffer
- Children: Alfred Pfeiffer; Oscar Pfeiffer
- Awards: Gold medal for science and art (King of Prussia)

Ida Laura Pfeiffer (14 October 1797 – 27 October 1858), née Reyer, a famous early female Austrian professional traveler who became an explorer, ethnographer, and travel writer; her bestselling journals were translated into seven languages. She journeyed an estimated 32,000 kilometres (20,000 mi) by land and 240,000 kilometres (150,000 mi) by sea through Southeast Asia, the Americas, the Middle East, and Africa, and made two trips around the world between 1846 and 1855. Though a member of the geographical societies of both Paris and Berlin, she was denied membership by the Royal Geographical Society in London as it forbade the election of women before 1913.

== Early life ==
Ida Laura Reyer was born on 14 October 1797 in Vienna, in the Habsburg monarchy, to Anna Reyer and Aloys Reyer, a wealthy textile manufacturer. She was one of seven children, with five brothers and a younger sister.

Encouraged by her father, she received an education similar to that of her brothers, which was unusual for girls of her social class at the time. She was allowed considerable freedom as a child, preferred boys' clothing, and enjoyed sports and outdoor activity. In her later autobiographical writings she described herself as "wild as a boy, and bolder and more forward than my elder brothers".

Around 1802, when she was about five years old, she accompanied her family on a journey to Palestine and Egypt. She later recalled that this early experience of travel left a lasting impression on her imagination and interest in distant places.

Her father died in 1806, when she was about eight or nine years old. After his death, her mother Anna rejected the unconventional upbringing he had encouraged and insisted that she conform to more traditional expectations for girls, including wearing dresses and taking piano lessons.

In 1809, Vienna was occupied by the forces of Napoleon during the Napoleonic Wars. French troops were quartered in private homes throughout the city, including the Reyer household. During a military review at Schönbrunn Palace, she later recalled turning her back as the generals rode past, an act she described as a protest against the foreign occupation.

She was introduced to exploration literature by her tutor, Franz Josef Trimmel. She developed a strong interest in travel narratives, particularly Robinson Crusoe, and in the scientific writings of the explorer Alexander von Humboldt. Pfeiffer would later meet Humboldt in Berlin.

On 1 May 1820, at the age of twenty-two, she married Dr. Mark Anton Pfeiffer, a forty-six-year-old lawyer in Lemberg in Galicia, then part of the Austrian Empire (now Lviv, Ukraine). He was a widower with an adult son from his first marriage. The couple moved to Lemberg about a week after their wedding.

Dr. Pfeiffer soon lost his position after exposing corruption among senior government officials in Galicia and found it difficult to secure further employment. The family's financial situation deteriorated, and Pfeiffer travelled repeatedly between Lemberg and Vienna to support the household. She earned money by giving drawing and music lessons and occasionally borrowed money from her brothers.

Two sons were born in Vienna: Alfred in 1821 and Oscar in 1824. She also had a daughter who lived only a few days.

In 1831, after the death of her mother, Pfeiffer received a small inheritance that modestly improved the family's finances and allowed her to continue the education of her sons. By 1833, she was living in Vienna with the boys while her husband remained in Lemberg near his son from his first marriage, visiting the family in Vienna only occasionally.

== Travels ==
=== Istanbul, Jerusalem, and Iceland (1842–1845) ===
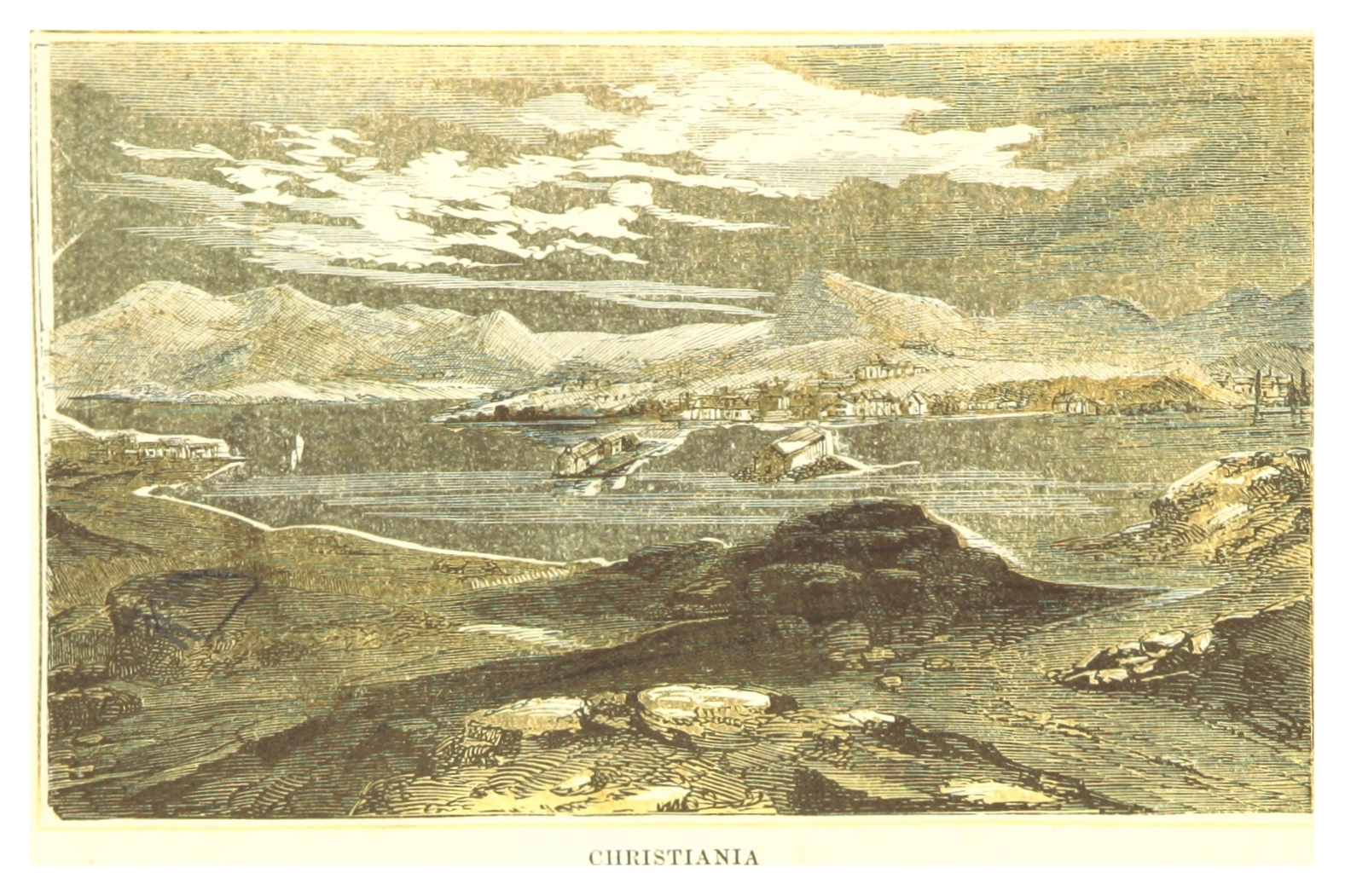
Image extracted from page 169 of Visit to Iceland and the Scandinavian North (Second edition), by PFEIFFER, Ida Laura. Original held and digitized by the British Library.

At 45 years old with her sons grown and settled in secure employment, Pfeiffer was finally able to fulfill her childhood dream of traveling to foreign places. She later wrote in Reise nach dem skandinavischen Norden und der Insel Island im Jahre 1845 ("Visit to Iceland and the Scandinavian North," 2 vols., Leipzig, 1845):

When I was but a little child, I had already a strong desire to see the world. Whenever I met a travelling-carriage, I would stop involuntarily, and gaze after it until it had disappeared; I used even to envy the postilion, for I thought he also must have accomplished the whole long journey.

In 1842, she first traveled along the River Danube to Istanbul, from there she continued to Jerusalem, stopping at Smyrna, Rhodes, Cyprus, Beirut, Caesarea, and Jaffa. She returned to Beirut on 10 July 1842 and sailed for Egypt. She visited Alexandria, Cairo, and the Red Sea before returning home via Rome. Among those she met on the trip was landscape painter Hubert Sattler, the British artist William Henry Bartlett, and the Bohemian botanist, Count Friedrich von Berchtold.

She published an anonymous account of her journey in Reise einer Wienerin in das Heilige Land ("A Vienna woman's trip to the Holy Land," 2 vols., Vienna, 1844). In return, she received 700 florins to fund her next trip. The book was an instant success. It went through three editions and was translated into Czech in 1846 and English in 1852.

In 1845, Pfeiffer set out to Scandinavia and Iceland. In preparation for her travel, she studied English and Danish as well as how to preserve natural specimens and take daguerreotypes. The adventure began on 10 April 1845. She traveled from Vienna to Copenhagen, then boarded the Johann on 4 May, reaching Hafnarfjörður on the southwest coast of Iceland in eleven days. She rode to Reykjavík on horseback and toured the geothermal area of Krýsuvík. She proceeded to visit the Golden Falls and climb the volcano Mount Hekla. After her return to Denmark, she took a small steamer north to Gothenburg, Sweden and from there, went further north to Norway.

She came back to Vienna on 4 October 1845 and published her journal the following year: Reise nach dem skandinavischen Norden und der Insel Island ("Trip to the Scandinavian North and the island of Iceland," Pest, 1846). English translations of the book appeared in Britain and the US in 1852.

=== First trip round the world (1846–1848) ===
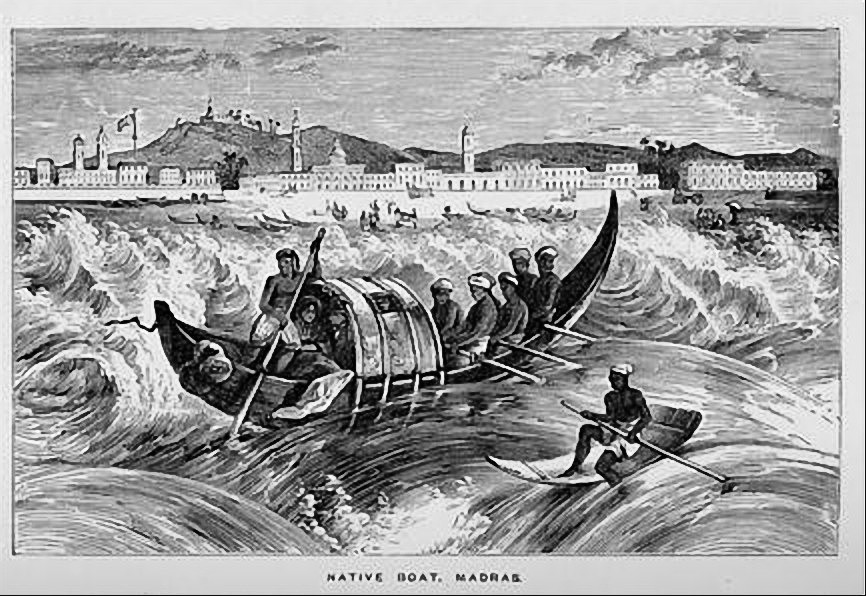
Illustration from "The Story of Ida Pfeiffer and her Travels in many Lands"

In 1846, Pfeiffer started on a journey round the world, visiting Brazil, Chile and other countries of South America, Tahiti, China, India, Persia, Asia Minor and Greece, returning to Vienna in 1848. The results were published in Eine Frauenfahrt um die Welt ("A Woman's Journey round the World," 3 vols., Vienna, 1850).

She boarded the Danish brig Caroline, sailing southwest from Hamburg out into the Atlantic and across the equator, entering the harbor of Rio de Janeiro on 16 September 1846. Along with Friedrich von Berchtold, she traveled up the Macacu River to Nova Friburgo in southeastern Brazil and ventured deep into the forest, accompanied by a single servant. Upon her return to Rio, she booked a spot on the English barque John Renwick and set off for Chile, arriving at Valparaíso on 2 March 1847. She then sailed to the island of Tahiti before disembarking in Macao on the coast of China on 9 July.

For the next two months, she visited temples and villages in Hong Kong, went on a hunting excursion in Singapore, toured Colombo and Kandy, inquired about Bengali traditions in Calcutta, and visited the holy city of Benares. From Delhi, she arranged a bullock cart to Bombay under the advisement of Austrian scholar Aloys Sprenger, passing through Hyderabad and the Daulatabad Fort and the Ellora Caves in Aurangabad.

On 23 April 1848, she left Bombay for Baghdad, then part of the Ottoman Empire. While exploring the ruins of the ancient city of Ctesiphon, she encountered Prince Emam Qoli Mirza of the Qajar dynasty. She proceeded to tour the archaeological sites of Babylon, Borsippa, and Nineveh, facilitated by the British Resident Henry Creswicke Rawlinson and Hormuzd Rassam, the British Vice-Consul at Mosul. During the month of Ramadan, she visited local homes in Tabriz, the capital of Azerbaijan (now East Azerbaijan Province in Iran), and was presented to the Vicegerent, Bahman Mirza.

In August 1848, she set out for Nakhchivan bordering Armenia, and soon joined a caravan heading for Tbilisi, the capital of Georgia. She then crossed the Black Sea into the Russian Empire.

A Woman's Journey Round the World was published in 1850 in three volumes, two years after Pfeiffer's return to Vienna. English translations appeared in Britain in 1851, followed by Dutch (1852), French (1858), and Russian (1867). The book garnered reviews in major international journals, such as Le Constitutionnel, The Athenaeum, The Westminster Review, The Literary Gazette, The Straits Times, and Calcutta Review.

=== Second trip round the world (1851–1855) ===
To fund her next expedition, Pfeiffer sold 300 guilders worth of specimens to the Royal Museum of Vienna. Carl von Schreibers, director of the Viennese natural history collections, and Austrian archaeologist Josef von Arneth applied for governmental funding on her behalf on the grounds that she had proven herself skilled at procuring rare specimens from far corners of the world. As a result, Pfeiffer was awarded 1,500 guilders.

In 1851, she set off to Berlin where she was met with an enthusiastic audience. Among them was her childhood hero, Prussian explorer Alexander von Humboldt, whose travels in the Americas inspired a great number of contemporary scientists and naturalists, including Charles Darwin, Henry David Thoreau, John Muir, and Ernst Haeckel. Pfeiffer was also welcomed by German geographer and cartographer Carl Ritter who was, at the time, professor of geography at the University of Berlin and with whom she would continue to collaborate after her departure. Both Humboldt and Ritter supported her, and as a result she became the first woman to be awarded the honorary membership of the Geographical Society of Berlin. From Hamburg, Pfeiffer set sail to London and met with paleontologist Richard Owen, an outspoken critic of Charles Darwin, geographer Augustus Petermann for his expertise on Africa, and William Bartlett, her traveling companion to Jerusalem.

On 27 May 1851, Pfeiffer departed for Cape Town, South Africa. She arrived on 11 August and soon sent a box of specimens to Vincenz Kollar, curator of the Natural History Museum in Vienna. She had intended to penetrate deeper into Africa, but her hopes proved impracticable in light of overwhelming expenses.

She proceeded across the Indian Ocean to the Malay Archipelago, spending two weeks in Singapore where she collected a new species of mole cricket in addition to fish, seaweed, and crustaceans. She spent eighteen months in the Sunda Islands, accompanied by Captain John Brooke, the nephew and heir of Sir James Brooke. She visited the Dayaks of Borneo and became one of the first explorers to report on the traditions of the Bataks in Sumatra and the Malukus. Along the way, she encountered Sultan Abdu'l Rashid Muhammad Jamal ud-din of the principality of Sintang, renowned ichthyologist Dr Pieter Bleeker in Batavia (present-day Jakarta), and Colonel van der Hart at Bukittinggi in West Sumatra. She was granted permission to enter the territories of local villages where she observed dance performances, acquired a finely carved tunggal panaluan, and accumulated a collection of valuable specimens, including ray-finned fish (Homalopterula gymnogaster) and checker barb (Puntius oligolepis).

On 6 July 1853, she sailed across the Pacific to North America. She arrived on the West Coast of the United States during the California Gold Rush and visited Sacramento, Marysville, Crescent City, Santa Clara, and San Jose before heading south to Central America. After stops at New Granada and Peru, she returned to Guayaquil, the main port of Ecuador. In her book A Lady's Second Journey Round the World she relates some unpleasant experiences in Ecuador. However, the ambassador of the United States Friedrich Hassaurek in his book Four Years among Spanish-Americans criticized these chapters of her book, as he conceived it as interesting as a personal narrative, but full of misconceptions and inaccuracies.

On 31 May 1854, she boarded a steamer bound for New Orleans where she stayed for three weeks, then toured the Great Lakes Region. In her journal, she described visits to American circuses, theaters, private girls' schools, the Manhattan Detention Complex as well as encounters with the eminent short story writer, Washington Irving, the celebrated surgeon John Collins Warren, and Swiss-American biologist Louis Agassiz.

Back in Vienna at the end of July 1855, Pfeiffer completed her narrative, Meine zweite Weltreise ("My second trip around the world"), published in Vienna in 1856. The English translation, Second Journey round the World, was published by Longmans, followed by editions in Dutch (1856), French (1857), Polish (1860), Russian (1876), and Malay (1877–1907). The book was well received with positive reviews in Austrian and German newspapers, the English Edinburgh Review, and the American literary magazine Criterion.

=== Madagascar (1856–1858) ===
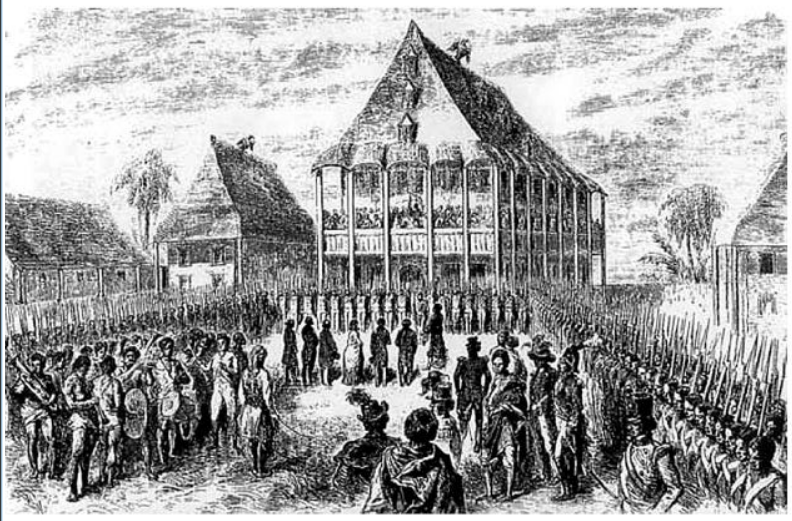
Trial of Ida Pfeiffer and Jean Laborde

In May 1857, Pfeiffer set out to explore Madagascar. Her first stop was Cape Town, South Africa. There, she encountered the French civil engineer and slave trader Joseph-François Lambert. Unbeknownst to Pfeiffer, Lambert had joined Jean Laborde and a few other Europeans in a plot to replace Ranavalona I, the queen of Madagascar, with the more moderate crown prince, Rakoto (the future king Radama II). Pfeiffer unwittingly became part of the conspiracy and was expelled from Madagascar in July 1857 after the queen discovered the attempted coup.

During Pfeiffer's passage from the capital of Antananarivo to the coastal port of departure, she had unfortunately contracted a disease (likely malaria) and never fully recovered. She suffered through spells of fever on Mauritius and left for London on 10 March 1858. She then traveled to Hamburg but was struck by a renewed outbreak of vomiting and diarrhea.

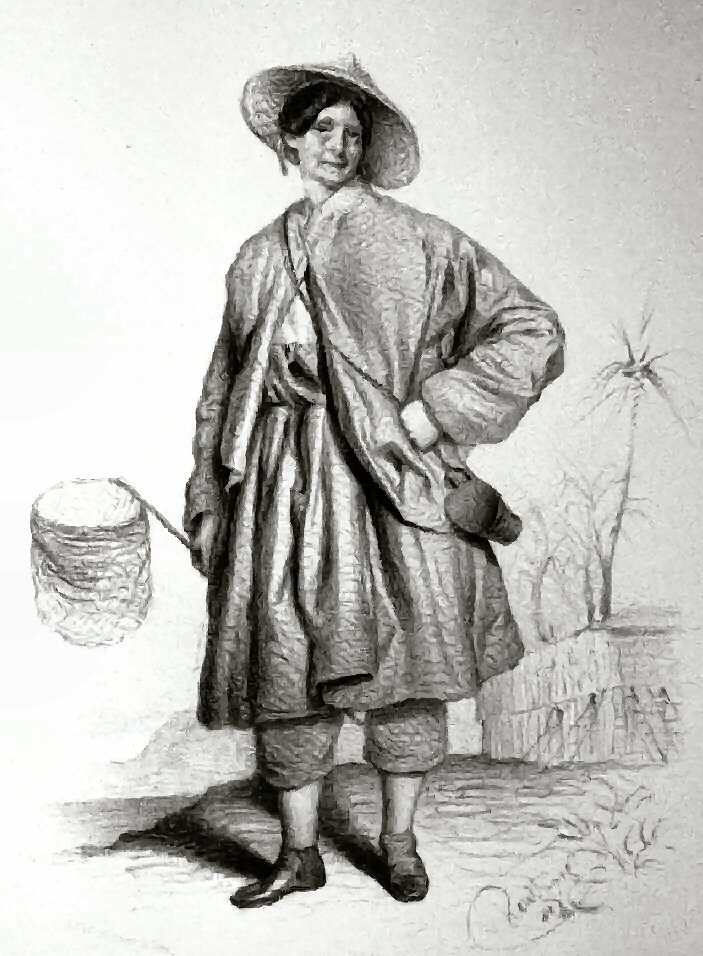
Ida Pfeiffer dressed for a collection foray with an insect net and a specimen container slung over her shoulder (lithograph by Adolf Dauthage).

== Natural history ==
During her travels, Pfeiffer collected plants, insects, mollusks, marine life, and mineral specimens. Many were sold to Museum für Naturkunde in Berlin and the British Museum, including but not limited to:

- Orb-weaver spider (Poltys idae)
- Lonchodes pfeifferae
- Freshwater prawn (Palaemon idae)
- Snails (Vaginula idae and Pupina superba)
- Soft-shell turtles from Ambon and Seram of Maluku

The Naturhistorisches Museum in Vienna purchased 721 specimens from Pfeiffer's collection in Madagascar and Mauritius, including nine species of mammals, fourteen species of birds, 23 species of reptiles, three species of crustaceans, fifteen species of mollusks, ten species of spiders, and 185 species of insects.

== Death ==
After returning to Vienna in September 1858, weakened by illness contracted during her expedition to Madagascar, Pfeiffer died on 27 October 1858 at the home of her brother, Carl Reyer, aged 61. Her final travel narrative, Reise nach Madagaskar, describing the expedition that ended her travelling career, was published posthumously in 1861 together with a biographical memoir prepared by her son Oscar Pfeiffer.

== Legacy and influence ==
=== Influence on contemporaries ===
Ida Laura Pfeiffer's travel writings attracted wide attention during the mid-19th century and were read by both the general public and the scientific community. Her books, which described journeys through the Middle East, Southeast Asia, the Americas, and Africa, were translated into several European languages and circulated widely among readers interested in geography, natural history, and ethnography. Through these works Pfeiffer became one of the best-known travel writers of her generation.

Several prominent writers and naturalists drew upon Pfeiffer's observations. Henry David Thoreau referred to her as "Madam Pfeiffer" in Walden (1854), citing her remarks about cultural practices and standards of beauty in Southeast Asia.

The naturalist Alfred Russel Wallace also mentioned Pfeiffer in his correspondence, including letters to his sister and to his colleague Henry Walter Bates. Wallace later travelled through several of the same regions that Pfeiffer had explored earlier, including parts of the Malay Archipelago, and was familiar with her published accounts of the region.

Charles Darwin cited Pfeiffer in The Descent of Man (1871), quoting her observation that "in Java, a yellow, not a white girl, is considered, according to Madame Pfeiffer, a beauty." Darwin used the remark as an example of the cultural variability of human standards of attractiveness.

=== Scientific legacy ===
In addition to writing widely read travel accounts, Pfeiffer contributed to the scientific study of the regions she visited. During her expeditions she collected numerous zoological, botanical, and geological specimens, many of which were later examined by European naturalists and incorporated into museum collections. Her collecting work helped document the natural history of several regions that had previously been little studied by European scientists.

Her contributions were also recognised through scientific naming. In 1867 the Austrian zoologist Franz Steindachner named the Madagascan frog Boophis idae in her honour, commemorating the specimens she had collected during her final expedition.

=== Recognition and commemoration ===
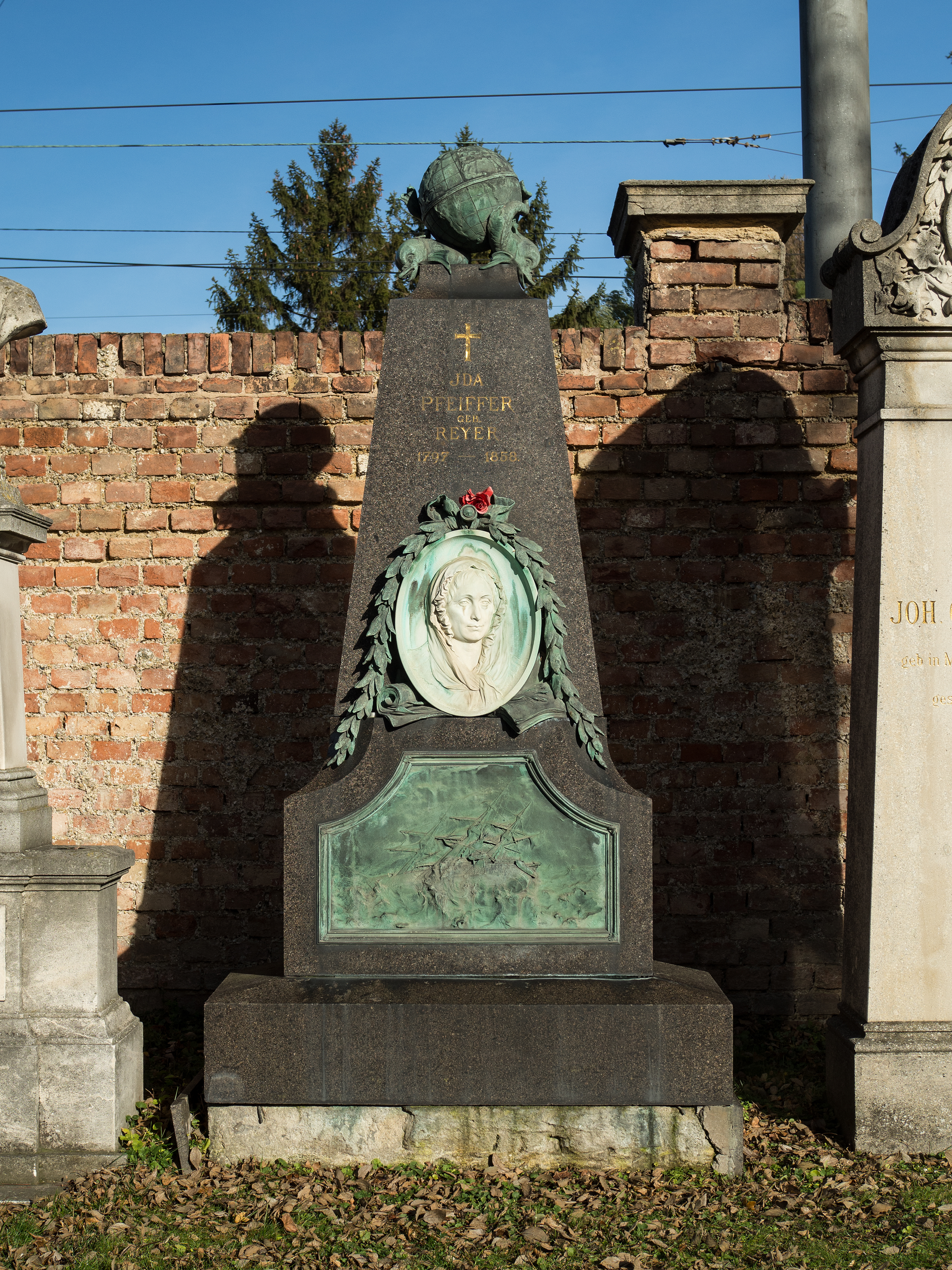
Grave of Ida Pfeiffer, Vienna, 2017

Recognition for Pfeiffer's achievements grew during her lifetime. Her expeditions were supported in part by a grant of 1,500 gulden from the Austrian government. She also received assistance from leading figures in European geography: the explorer Alexander von Humboldt and the geographer Carl Ritter provided letters of introduction that helped facilitate her travels and brought her work to the attention of scientific institutions.

With Humboldt's support, Pfeiffer became the first woman elected an honorary member of the Geographical Society of Berlin, and she was later admitted as an honorary member of the Geographical Society of Paris.

In recognition of her achievements in exploration and scientific collecting, King Frederick William IV of Prussia awarded her the Gold Medal for Science and Art.

Pfeiffer's reputation continued to grow after her death. In 1892 the Viennese Society for the Further Education of Women arranged for her remains to be transferred to a place of honour in Vienna Central Cemetery, where she became the first woman admitted to the section reserved for distinguished citizens.

Her name has also been commemorated in modern institutions and public spaces. In 2000 a street in Munich was renamed Ida-Pfeiffer-Straße, and in 2018 the University of Vienna established an Ida Pfeiffer Professorship in the Faculty of Earth Sciences, Geography and Astronomy.

== Historiography ==
Pfeiffer's life and travels have attracted sustained scholarly attention from historians of exploration, travel writing, and gender history. Her journeys and published narratives have been examined as early examples of women's participation in scientific travel and global exploration during the nineteenth century.

Recent scholarship has reassessed Pfeiffer's role in the development of travel literature and the scientific networks of the nineteenth century, emphasizing both the scale of her journeys and the natural history specimens she collected during her expeditions.

Major studies of Pfeiffer's life include:

- Jehle, Hiltgund (1989). Ida Pfeiffer: Weltreisende im 19. Jahrhundert: Zur Kulturgeschichte reisender Frauen. Münster: Waxmann. ISBN 9783893250202.
- van Wyhe, John (2019). Wanderlust: The Amazing Ida Pfeiffer, the First Female Tourist. Singapore: NUS Press. ISBN 9789813250765.
- Habinger, Gabriele (2022). Eine Wiener Biedermeierdame erobert die Welt: Die Lebensgeschichte der Ida Pfeiffer (1797–1858). Vienna: Promedia. ISBN 978-3-85371-508-6.
- Sistach, Xavier (2023). Les aventures d'Ida Pfeiffer. La Bisbal d'Empordà: Edicions Sidillà. ISBN 9788412575989.

These studies situate Pfeiffer within the broader history of nineteenth-century exploration and travel writing, highlighting her as one of the earliest women to undertake extensive independent journeys around the world and as a pioneering figure in the development of modern travel literature.
