= Frederick Boyle =

Frederick Boyle (1841–1914) was an English author, journalist, barrister, and orchid fancier.

== Early life and travels ==
Born in Stoke-on-Trent, Boyle was a nephew of Joseph Meyer. He matriculated in 1859 as an undergraduate at Brasenose College, Oxford, and was called to the bar in 1866. In 1863, he went to Sarawak with his brother: this visit provided material for a book, and chapters in several other volumes of travel accounts from Asia, South Africa, and Central and South America. In 1866 he donated to the British Museum a large number of archeological artefacts he had collected while travelling in Nicaragua.

== Writer ==
He also published a number of novels. and a variety of articles in journals

He described himself as a barrister and journalist in census records from 1871 to 1901; in 1911 he just did 'literary work'. He was a newspaper correspondent in the Russo-Turkish war, and was a regular contributor to the Daily Telegraph, the Pall Mall Gazette and periodicals such as All the Year Round, Blackwood's, Cornhill, The Illustrated London News, Temple Bar, The New Review, and The Nineteenth Century. He collaborated with Ashmore Russan on three titles serialised in the Boy's Own Paper and later published as books.

== Later life ==
In later life he wrote a number of books about orchids, which he kept as a hobby. He committed suicide in Bayswater Road, Westminster, London, in April, 1914, when 'much depressed'.
