= Henry Ling Roth =

British anthropologist (1855–1925)

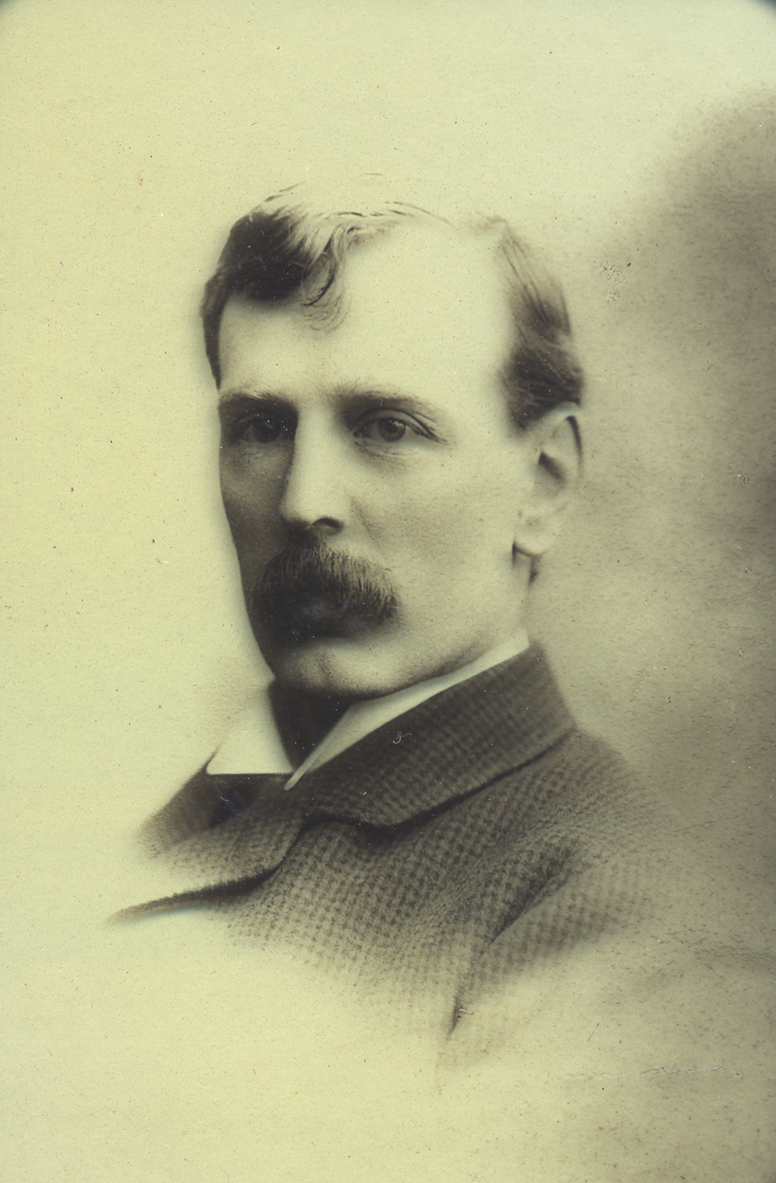
Photograph of Roth in the 1890s.

Henry Ling Roth (3 February 1855 – 12 May 1925) was an English-born anthropologist and museum curator, active in Australia.

Henry Ling Roth's collection of books was acquired by the library of the University of Manchester in 1917.
