= George Foggo =

English painter

- Born: 14 April 1793; London, England
- Died: 26 September 1869 (aged 76)
- Resting place: Highgate Cemetery
- Occupations: Painter, Lithographer, Publisher
- Relatives: James Foggo (Brother)

George Foggo (1793–1869) was a historical painter, born in London on 14 April 1793.

Foggo received his early education with his brother, James Foggo, in Paris, and joined him in London in 1819, after which the two were inseparably associated in their work and life. They founded a society for obtaining free access to English museums, public edifices, and works of art, of which the Duke of Sussex was president, Joseph Hume chairman of committees, and George Foggo honorary secretary. He also worked as a lithographer with his brother, and they lithographed their large picture of Parga and other original works; in 1828 he published by himself a set of large lithographs from the cartoons by Raphael. Foggo published in 1844 a catalogue of the pictures of the National Gallery, with critical remarks, the first attempt to make the collection intelligible to the public.

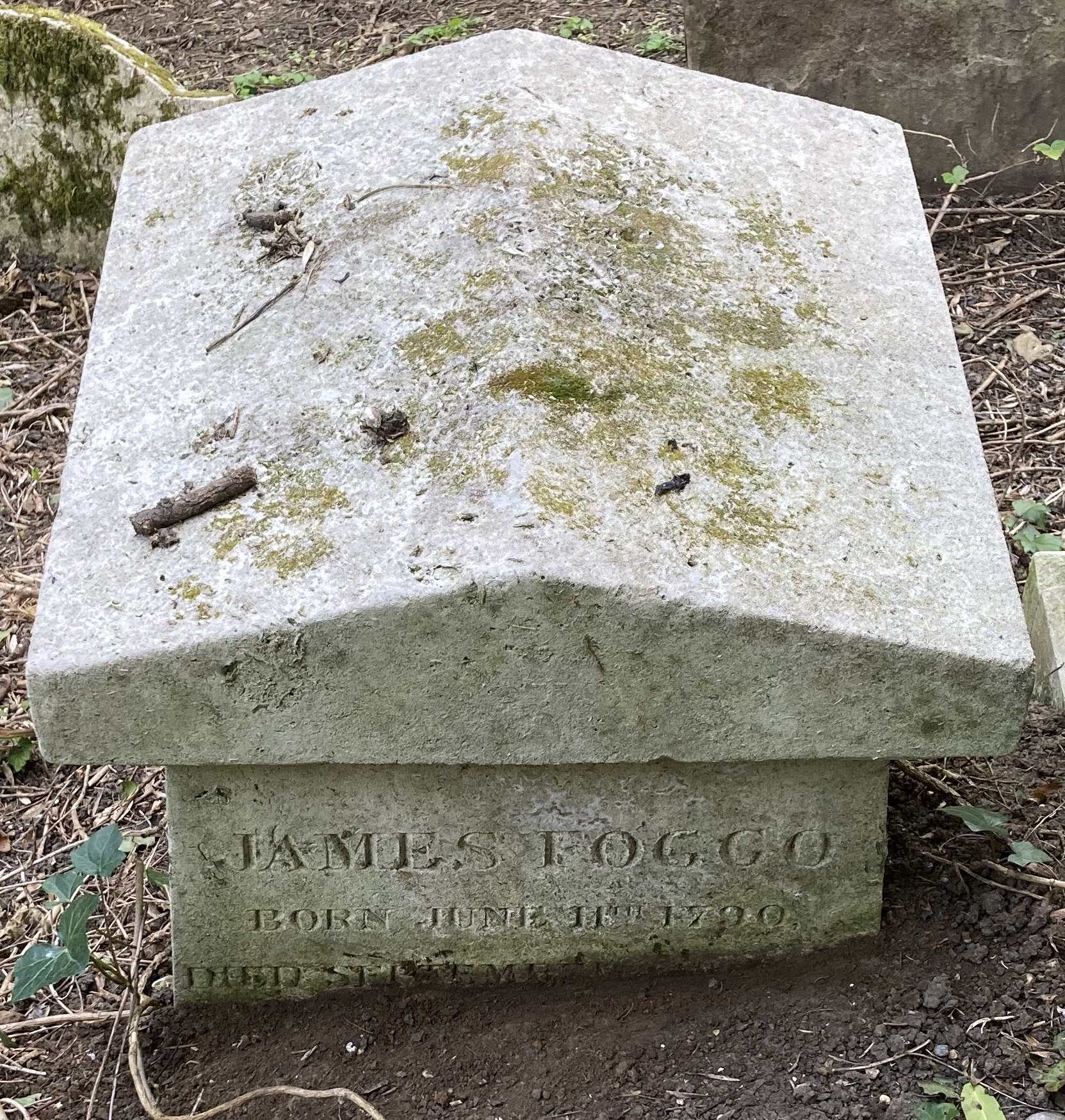
Grave of George Foggo in Highgate Cemetery

Together with his brother, he was an unsparing critic of the Royal Academy and its system of education, and published some pamphlets on the subject. He was associated with other plans for the advancement of art, and was a man of great energy. He also published in 1853 the Adventures of Sir J. Brooke, Rajah of Sarawak.

He died in London 26 September 1869, aged 76, and was buried with his brother James on the western side of Highgate Cemetery.
