= Spenser St. John =

British diplomat (1825–1910)

Sir Spenser St. John GCMG FRGS

Personal details
- Born: Spenser Buckingham St. John; 22 December 1825
- Died: 3 January 1910 (aged 84) Somers Town, London, England, United Kingdom
- Spouse: Mary Armstrong (m.1899)
- Domestic partner: Dayang Kamariah (in Labuan 1853?-1859?)
- Children: Ellen (1855-?); Sulong/Charles (1857-?)
- Parents: James Augustus St. John (father); Eliza Caroline Agar Hansard (mother)
- Occupation: British Consul, writer

Sir Spenser Buckingham St. John GCMG FRGS (22 December 1825 – 3 January 1910) was British Consul in Brunei in the mid 19th century.

== Early life ==
On 20 September 1827, Spenser was baptised at St Pancras Old Church.

== Diplomatic career ==
In 1847 St John's father, the journalist James Augustus St. John, introduced him to James Brooke. He went out to Sarawak the following year to become Brooke's private secretary and thus began his diplomatic career. He was British Consul General in Brunei from 1856 and in 1858 made two ascents of Mount Kinabalu with Hugh Low. One of the peaks of Mount Kinabalu, "St John's Peak" (4,091 m – 4 metres shorter than the summit, "Low's Peak"), is named in his honour. He wrote a book about his explorations in Borneo, Life in the Forests of the Far East (1862), and two biographies of James Brooke (1879 and 1899).

In 1863 St John became British chargé d'affaires in Haiti and in 1871 took up the same post in the Dominican Republic. He was promoted to Minister in Haiti late in 1872, and was chargé d'affaires in Lima and Minister in Peru from 1874 to 1883; he was awarded the KCMG in 1881. While in Peru he made a collection of pottery which is now in the British Museum.

In 1884 St John published a memoir of his experiences in Haiti, Hayti: Or, The Black Republic, which caused public outrage with its sensational tales of cannibalism in the Vodou religion. He is also quoted as saying that "The History of the country [Haiti] ... is but a series of plots and revolutions followed by barbarous military executions."

St John was Envoy Extraordinary and Minister Plenipotentiary to Mexico from 1884 to 1893, and helped to restore relations between Britain and Mexico, which had been broken since the French intervention in Mexico.

St John retired after serving as Minister to Sweden from 1893 to 1896; he was made GCMG in 1894.

== Marriage and death ==
St John had a relationship with a Malay woman named Dayang Kamariah, with whom he had a son, Sulong, later baptised as Charles when he was 10. He later trained as a civil engineer, and worked in a government position in Perak.

In 1899, at the age of 73, he married the 31-year old Mary Armstrong in Paris. They settled in Camberley, and he died on 3 January 1910.

== Works ==
- Life in the Forests of the Far East (1862)
- Hayti: or, The Black Republic (1884)
- The life of Sir James Brooke : rajah of Sarawak : from his personal papers and correspondence (1879)
- Rajah Brooke: the Englishman as ruler of an eastern state (1897)
- The adventures of a naval officer (1905) [under pseudonym Charles Hunter]
- Essays on Shakespeare and his works (1908)

== See also ==
- Cannibalism in the Americas § Haiti in the 19th century
