= Anglican Diocese of Singapore =

Protestant Christian denomination in Singapore

Diocese of Singapore
- Classification: Anglican
- Theology: Anglican doctrine
- Polity: Episcopal
- Bishop of Singapore: The Most Revd Titus Chung Khiam Boon
- Suffragan Bishop: Right Revd Low Jee King
- Cathedral: St Andrew's Cathedral, Singapore
- Ecclesiastical province: Church of the Province of South East Asia
- Associations: Anglican Communion; National Council of Churches of Singapore
- Headquarters: St Andrew's Village; 1 Francis Thomas Drive, #01- 01, Singapore
- Origin: 1826
- Parishes: 27
- Members: 18,000
- Official website: anglican.org.sg

Anglican Diocese of Singapore

Chinese name
- Traditional Chinese: 聖公會新加坡教區
- Simplified Chinese: 圣公会新加坡教区
Transcriptions
Standard Mandarin
- Hanyu Pinyin: Shènggōnghuì Xīnjīapō Jiàoqū
- Wade–Giles: Shengkunghui Hsinchiap'o Chiao-ch'ü
- Yale Romanization: Shèngūnghwèi Syīnjyāpwō Jyàuchyū

Tamil name
- Tamil: சிங்கப்பூர் ஆங்கிலிகன் மறைமாவட்டம்

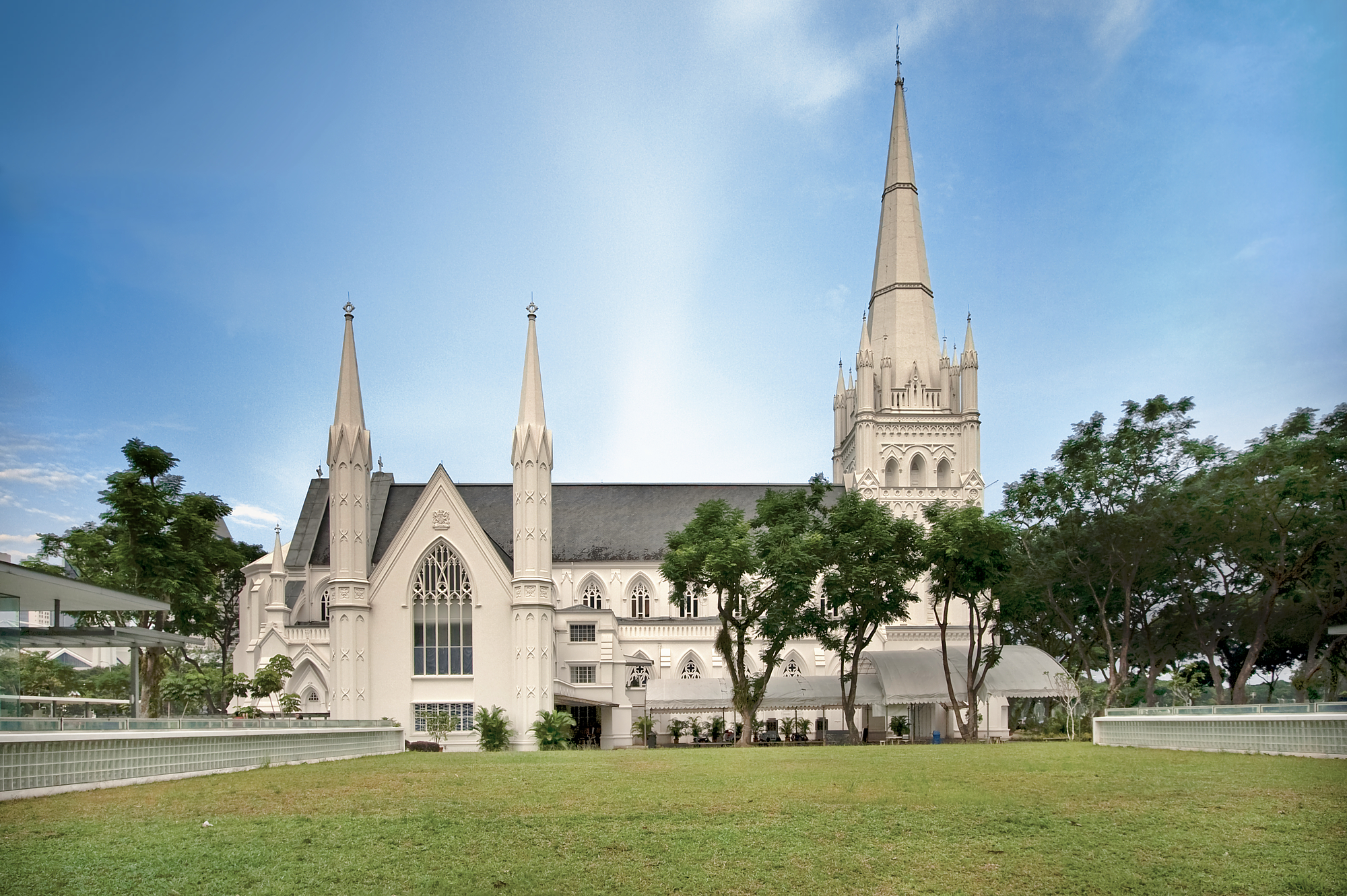
St Andrew's Cathedral is the cathedral church of the Diocese of Singapore

The Diocese of Singapore (Chinese: 圣公会新加坡教区; pinyin: Shènggōnghuì Xīnjiāpō Jiàoqū; Malay: Keuskupan Singapura; Tamil: சிங்கப்பூர் ஆங்கிலிகன் மறைமாவட்டம்) is a diocese of the Province of the Anglican Church in South East Asia consisting of 27 Anglican parishes in Singapore and 7 deaneries throughout the Asia region. It has an established history of church-planting as well as providing educational, medical and social services in Singapore and the neighbouring region. The Diocese of Singapore is in communion with the See of Canterbury. St Andrew's Cathedral is the cathedral church of the diocese. In 2017, Growth and Decline in the Anglican Communion: 1980 to the Present, published by Routledge, collected research reporting there were 58,000 Anglicans in Singapore.

The diocese is headed by The Most Revd Titus Chung Khiam Boon, who was preceded by the bishop and former vicar of St John's-St Margaret's Church, the Right Reverend Rennis Ponniah.

== Coat of arms ==
The coat of arms of the Diocese of Singapore, which belongs to the category of ecclesiastical heraldry, consists of a mitre surmounted on a St Andrew's Shield. The mitre symbolises apostolic authority and divine endorsement to govern the Anglican diocese in the region. The crozier symbolises the bishop's episcopate and the key represents the access to heaven. Emblazoned upon the St Andrew's Shield are four bunches of wheat symbolising the harvest fields which God has entrusted to the diocese.

== History ==
The Anglican community in Singapore has its roots in 1826, shortly after the founding of modern Singapore by Sir Stamford Raffles in 1819 and the arrival of the first English settlers from the British East India Company.

Raffles allocated a piece of land between Hill Street and North Bridge Road in his Town Plan of 1822 for the siting of an Anglican church. However, construction of the church did not begin until funds were raised by the community in 1834. The church was named Saint Andrew after the patron saint of Scotland in honour of the Scottish community who had donated to the building fund.

After falling under jurisdiction of the bishop of Labuan and Sarawak (and no longer Calcutta) in 1869, St. Andrew's Cathedral was made the cathedral church of the diocese in 1870. Officially titled Diocese of Singapore, Labuan and Sarawak in 1881, a diocese over such a large area was quite unmanageable. In 1909 Singapore was made a separate diocese covering the Straits Settlements, Peninsular Malaya, Siam, Java, Sumatra and adjacent islands, with Bishop Charles J. Ferguson-Davie as the first bishop of the diocese. On 6 February 1960, it was renamed to Diocese of Singapore and Malaya. On 8 April 1970, the diocese was dissolved and split into Diocese of Singapore and Diocese of West Malaysia.

In 1996, the autocephalous Church of the Province of South East Asia (the "Province") consisting of the Dioceses of Singapore, West Malaysia, Kuching and Sabah was established by the then-Archbishop of Canterbury, George Carey. Moses Tay, Bishop of Singapore, was installed as the first Metropolitan Archbishop of the Province the same year.

The Province, which celebrated its 20th anniversary in February 2016, declared itself to be in impaired communion with the Episcopal Church (previously Episcopal Church of the United States of America or ECUSA) following the consecration of Bishop Gene Robinson in 2003. In 2018, the Province recognised the Anglican Church in North America ("ACNA") as a fellow Anglican province and declared itself to be in full communion with the clergy of ACNA.

The ACNA advocates strict adherence to an orthodox Anglican theology based on the traditional doctrinal statement of Anglicanism in the Thirty-nine Articles of Religion of 1571 and stipulates that these be "taken in their literal and grammatical sense". In the installation of Titus Chung as the 10th Anglican Bishop of Singapore, the bells at St Andrew’s Cathedral – where the consecration and enthronement service took place – were rung 39 times to symbolise the Thirty-nine Articles of Religion of the Anglican Church.

== List of bishops ==
- The Right Revd George Frederick Hose, Bishop of Singapore, Labuan & Sarawak (1881–1909)
- The Right Revd Charles James Ferguson-Davie (1909–1927)
- The Right Revd Basil Colby Roberts (1927–1941)
- The Right Revd John Leonard Wilson (1941–49)
- The Right Revd Henry Wolfe Baines (1949–1961)
- The Right Revd Cyril Kenneth Sansbury (1961–66)
- The Right Revd Joshua Chiu Ban It (1966–1982)
- The Right Revd Moses Tay Leng Kong (1982–2000)
- The Right Revd John Chew Hiang Chea (2000–2012)
- The Right Revd Rennis Ponniah (2012–20)
- The Most Revd Titus Chung (2020–)

== Parishes ==
As of 2018, there are 27 Anglican parishes in the diocese:

- St Andrew's Cathedral
- All Saints' Church
- Chapel of Christ the King
- Chapel of Christ the Redeemer
- Chapel of the Holy Spirit
- Chapel of the Resurrection
- Church of Our Saviour
- Church of the Ascension
- Church of the Epiphany
- Church of the Good Shepherd
- Church of the True Light
- Holy Trinity Parish
- Light of Christ Church Woodlands
- Marine Parade Christian Centre
- My Saviour's Church
- Parish of Christ Church (Tamil)
- St Andrew’s City Church
- St Andrew's Community Chapel
- St George's Church
- St Hilda's Church
- St James' Church
- St John's Chapel
- St John's–St Margaret's Church
- St Matthew's Church
- St Paul's Church
- St Peter's Church
- Yishun Christian Church (Anglican)

== Deaneries ==
There are six deaneries in the Diocese of Singapore:

- Cambodia
- Laos
- Indonesia
- Nepal
- Timor-Leste
- Thailand
- Vietnam

A dean oversees the mission work in each deanery and regularly reports to the director of missions of the Diocese of Singapore.

== Schools ==
Anglican schools in Singapore:

- Anglican High School
- Christ Church Secondary School
- Saint Hilda's Primary School
- Saint Hilda's Secondary School
- St. Margaret's Primary School
- St. Margaret's Secondary School
- Saint Andrew's Junior School
- St. Andrew's Secondary School
- St. Andrew's Junior College
- St. Andrew's Autism School
- St. Andrew's Mission School

Additionally, there are eleven preschools as of 2024:

- Little Seeds Preschool (Ascension)
- Little Seeds Preschool (Church of the Ascension)
- Little Seeds Preschool (Church of the Good Shepherd)
- Little Seeds Preschool (Kiddy Ark)
- Little Seeds Preschool (Praiseland)
- Little Seeds Preschool (Sonshine)
- Little Seeds Preschool (St. Andrew's)
- Little Seeds Preschool (St. Hilda's Church)
- Little Seeds Preschool (St. James' Church)
- Little Seeds Preschool (St. John's-St. Margaret's)
- Little Seeds Preschool (St. Paul's Church)

== Medical services ==
St Andrew's Community Hospital, Simei

The St Andrew's Mission Hospital (SAMH) is a non-profit voluntary welfare organisation under the Diocese of Singapore. It is the corporate headquarters that oversees several medical arms:

- St Andrew's Community Hospital, located at Simei Street 3 with over 100 beds
- St Andrew's Autism Centre
- St Andrew's Senior Care which provides eldercare services at four centres island-wide
- St Andrew's Mission Hospital Clinic, a primary care clinic in Simei and Elliot Road
- St Andrew's Lifestreams, located at St Andrew's Village, this Centre provides counselling services primarily for Anglican schools
- St Andrew's Nursing Home

== See also ==
- Church of the Province of South East Asia
- Church of England
- Bishop of Singapore
- Christ Church Bangkok
