= Bishop of West Malaysia =

- Bishopric

Anglican
- Incumbent; Rt Rev Dr Stephen Soe Chee Cheng

Location
- Country: Malaysia
- Territory: Peninsular Malaysia
- Ecclesiastical province: Church of the Province of South East Asia

Information
- First holder: Francis Thomas McDougall
- Established: 1814, current establishment in 1970
- Diocese: West Malaysia
- Cathedral: St. Mary's Cathedral

The Bishop of West Malaysia is an Anglican prelate who oversees the Diocese of West Malaysia in the Church of the Province of South East Asia. The current bishop is the 5th Bishop of the Diocese since its creation in 1970. His seat is St. Mary's Cathedral, Kuala Lumpur.

== History ==
Anglicanism came to the Malay Peninsula following the establishment of the British East India Company's administered settlement on Penang island in 1786. The local magistrate, George Caunter, was appointed a Lay Clerk/Acting Chaplain to provide spiritual ministry to the settlers. Under his ministry the first entry into the Church Register was made in 1799. The Diocese of Calcutta provided episcopal supervision for the chaplaincy work on Penang island and the first Anglican Church building, the Church of St. George the Martyr, was built and consecrated in 1819.

In 1867, the administration of the Straits Settlements passed from the hands of the East India Company to the British Crown and in 1869, Anglican churches in the Straits Settlements was placed under the episcopal supervision of the Bishop of Labuan and her Dependencies with the diocese expanded and renamed as the Diocese of Labuan, Sarawak and Singapore.

In 1909, the Straits Settlements was separated to form its own diocese, the Diocese of Singapore. With the Independence of Malaya in 1957 and by 1960, the diocese was renamed the Diocese of Singapore and Malaya. After the Independence of Singapore in 1965, Singapore was separated from the diocese and in 1970, the Diocese of West Malaysia was established with the former Bishop of Sabah, Roland Koh, being appointed as the first Bishop of West Malaysia.

In 2015, a decision was made by the Diocesan Synod to further divide the diocese into three separate dioceses and in 2016, two area dioceses were created, the Area Diocese of the Northern Peninsula and the Area Diocese of the Southern Peninsula, in preparation and two suffragan bishops were licensed to oversee the area dioceses. Provisional approval of the Provincial Synod for the creation of the new dioceses by 2020 has since been obtained.

== List of Bishops ==
Bishop of Calcutta
From	Until	Incumbent	Notes
1814	1823	Thomas Middleton	
1823	1827	Reginald Heber	
1827	1829	Thomas James	
1829	1832	John Turner	
1832	1858	Daniel Wilson	
1858	1867	George Cotton	
Bishop of Labuan, Sarawak and Singapore
From	Until	Incumbent	Notes
1869	1881	Walter Chambers	Churches in the Straits Settlements separated from the Diocese of Calcutta and placed under the Diocese of Labuan and Sarawak. Diocese renamed Diocese of Labuan, Sarawak and Singapore on 8 August 1855.
1882	1908	George Hose	
Bishop of Singapore
From	Until	Incumbent	Notes
1909	1927	Charles Ferguson-Davie	Churches in Malaya (including Singapore) were separated from the Diocese to form its own Diocese of Singapore on 24 August 1909.
1927	1940	Basil Roberts	
1941	1949	Leonard Wilson	
1949	1960	Henry Baines	
Bishop of Singapore and Malaya
From	Until	Incumbent	Notes
1960	1966	Kenneth Sansbury	The diocese was renamed the Diocese of Singapore and Malaya on 6 February 1960.
1966	1970	Chiu Ban It	First local to be consecrated Anglican Bishop.
Bishops of West Malaysia
From	Until	Incumbent	Notes
1970	1972	Rt Rev Tan Sri Roland Koh Peck-Chiang	The diocese was separated into the Diocese of West Malaysia and the Diocese of Singapore; translated from Sabah
1972	1994	Rt Rev Tan Sri John Savarimuthu	
1995	2006	Rt Rev Tan Sri Lim Cheng Ean	
2007	2020	Rt Rev Datuk Ng Moon Hing	Archbishop of South East Asia and Primate, 2016–2020
2021	2026	Rt Rev Dr D Steven Abbarrow	
2026	present	Rt Rev Dr Stephen Soe Chee Cheng	
