= Ng Moon Hing =

21st-century Chinese Anglican bishop

The Most Reverend Datuk Ng Moon Hing P.J.N.
- Bishop of West Malaysia and Archbishop of South East Asia
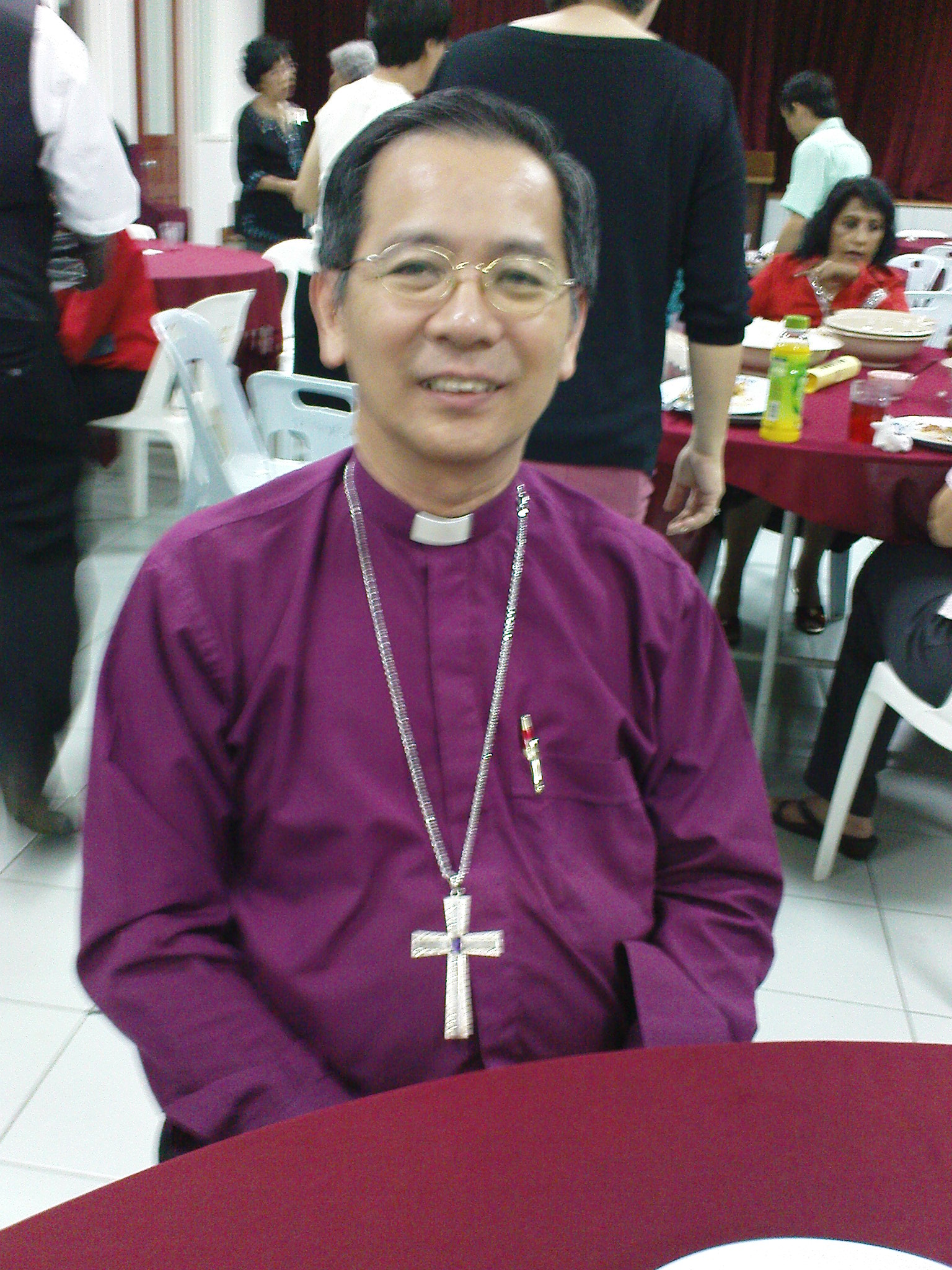
- Bishop Datuk Ng Moon Hing
- Native name: 黄满兴; 黃滿興
- Church: Anglican Communion
- Province: Church of the Province of South East Asia
- Diocese: West Malaysia
- See: St. Mary's Cathedral, Kuala Lumpur
- Installed: 2007
- Predecessor: Lim Cheng Ean
- Successor: Steven Abbarow

Orders
- Ordination: June 1985
- Consecration: 5 May 2007 by The Most Reverend Archbishop Dr. John Chew of South East Asia, the Bishop of Singapore and co-consecrated by The Most Reverend Archbishop Dr. Rowan Williams Canterbury

Personal details
- Born: 12 November 1955 (age 70) Ipoh, Perak, Federation of Malaya
- Denomination: Anglicanism
- Spouse: Datin Ding Siew Lan
- Children: 3
- Education: Monash University; Seminari Teologi Malaysia

Ng Moon Hing

Chinese name
- Traditional Chinese: 黃滿興
- Simplified Chinese: 黄满兴
Transcriptions
Standard Mandarin
- Hanyu Pinyin: Huáng Mǎnxīng
Hakka
- Pha̍k-fa-sṳ: Vòng Mân-hin
Yue: Cantonese
- Jyutping: Wong4 Mun5 Hing1
Southern Min
- Hokkien POJ: N̂g Boán-heng
- Tâi-lô: N̂g Buán-hing

The Most Reverend Datuk Ng Moon Hing, P.J.N. (simplified Chinese: 黄满兴; traditional Chinese: 黃滿興; pinyin: Huáng Mǎnxīng; Jyutping: Wong4 Mun5 Hing1; Pe̍h-ōe-jī: N̂g Boán-heng; born 12 November 1955) is the Anglican Bishop of West Malaysia. Until February 2020 he also served as Archbishop of the Church of the Province of South East Asia.

Ng was born on 12 November 1955 in the city of Ipoh, Perak, Federation of Malaya. He studied for a bachelor's degree in civil engineering from Monash University, Australia, graduating in 1978. After graduating, he worked as a civil engineer, taking part in the construction of Lumut Naval Base and several bridges in Malaysia.

Ng began to train for Christian ministry, and, in 1985, he graduated Bachelor of Divinity from Seminari Teologi Malaysia (STM). He was ordained deacon in June of that year. Subsequently, he was ordained priest in February of the following year. He was awarded a further Master of Divinity degree from STM in 1989.

In 1991, Ng was instituted as the Vicar of St. Peter's Church, Ipoh. In 1996, he was collated as a canon of St. Mary's Cathedral, Kuala Lumpur, and in 2001, he was appointed Archdeacon of the Lower North Archdeaconry.

On 5 May 2007, Ng was consecrated bishop in his cathedral in Kuala Lumpur, becoming the 4th Bishop of West Malaysia, in succession to Bishop Tan Sri Datuk Dr. Lim Cheng Ean. His principal consecrator was the then Archbishop of South East Asia Dr. John Chew, the Bishop of Singapore. Dr. Rowan Williams, then Archbishop of Canterbury, was also numbered among his consecrators.

Ng served a term as chairman of the Christian Federation of Malaysia (CFM), from 2009 to 2012. In 2011, Ng was made Knight Commander of the Distinguished Order of Service for the State (Panglima Jasa Negara, PJN) by the Yang di-Pertuan Agong, granting him the right to the Malaysian title 'Datuk'.

On 2 September 2015, Ng was elected to become 5th Archbishop of the Church of the Province of South East Asia by an Extraordinary General Meeting of the church's Synod meeting in Sandakan, Sabah, Malaysia. He began his four-year term of office on the 22 February 2016, succeeding Archbishop Bolly Lapok, and ended in February 2020. He will continue to serve as Bishop of West Malaysia until his retirement in November 2020.

Ng's memoir From Village to Village recounts his fifteen years of experience working with Anglican Village Ministries (AVM), which he founded in 1993.

Preceded by Lim Cheng Ean	Bishop of West Malaysia; 2007–2020	Succeeded by Steven Abbarow
Preceded by Bolly Lapok	Archbishop of South East Asia; 2016–2020	Succeeded by Melter Tais
