= National Council of Churches of Singapore =

Christian ecumenical forum

- Leader: Rt. Rev. Lu Guan Hoe
- Region: Singapore
- Official website: http://nccs.org.sg/

The National Council of Churches of Singapore (NCCS) is an ecumenical fellowship of Churches and Christian organisations in Singapore. It represents over 250 churches in Singapore.

The Council has been noted to be "socially conservative and theologically evangelical", embracing denominational and liturgical diversity. This has led several independent churches to seek membership in the council.

In recent years, it has also taken a more active stance, issuing statements on issues that the Council feels are of grave concern. These include the Pink Dot Movement and the new online gambling laws.

== History ==
In 1947, the Malayan Christian Council was officially inaugurated on 9 January 1948. The council was to oversee the Churches and Christian organisations of the federation of the British Crown Colonies of Singapore, North Borneo, and Sarawak. In 1967, the Malayan Christian Council was renamed the Council of Churches of Malaysia and Singapore.

In 1973, years after the expulsion of Singapore from Malaysia, due to administrative and sovereignty issues, the Council decided to split into separate Councils of Churches for each nation, the Council of Churches of Malaysia and the National Council of Churches of Singapore. The NCCS was then constituted on 24 July 1974. Reverend T.C. Nga became the first President of the NCSS.

== Presidents ==
Years	Name	Ref
1975	T.C. Nga	
John Chew
Robert Solomon
2012–2014	Terry Kee	
2014–2016	Wee Boon Hup	
2016–2018	Rennis Ponniah	
2018–2020	Terry Kee	
2020–2021	Keith Lai	
2021-2023	Titus Chung	
2023-2025	Lu Guan Hoe	

== Incidents ==
=== Performances ===
In 2012, Lady Gaga performed in Singapore as part of her Born This Way Ball concert tour. NCCS voiced concerns over the profanity and blasphemous content of her concert.

In May 2013, NCCS said it was looking into a complaint about Adam Lambert performing at The Star Performing Arts Centre, a commercial entity fully owned by Rock Productions, the business arm of New Creation Church. Lim K. Tham, general secretary of the council said it had received a complaint that "the gay lifestyle may be promoted at the concert" and that "The NCCS has conveyed this concern to New Creation so that it can make a response."

In a statement, the church said that according to stipulations from the authorities before the tender was awarded to Rock Productions, the venue had to operate "on a purely commercial basis and will not implement any leasing or pricing policies that will discriminate between religious groups, institutions or organisations from hiring the venue". The church said all public events require a public entertainment licence from the police, and it had "utmost confidence" in the policies and ability of government bodies such as the Media Development Authority to "protect the interest of the general public". The statement added that any event at the performing arts centre "should not be misconstrued or misunderstood" as the church "approving of its artistic presentation or endorsing the lifestyle of the performer".

In 2016, Madonna performed in Singapore as part of her Rebel Heart Tour. The performance was given a R18 rating in Singapore and had been altered for the Singapore audience with certain songs removed. NCCS had also voiced their concerns about the concert since December 2015.
