= Saint George's Church, Singapore =

Church in Singapore

St George’s Church Singapore
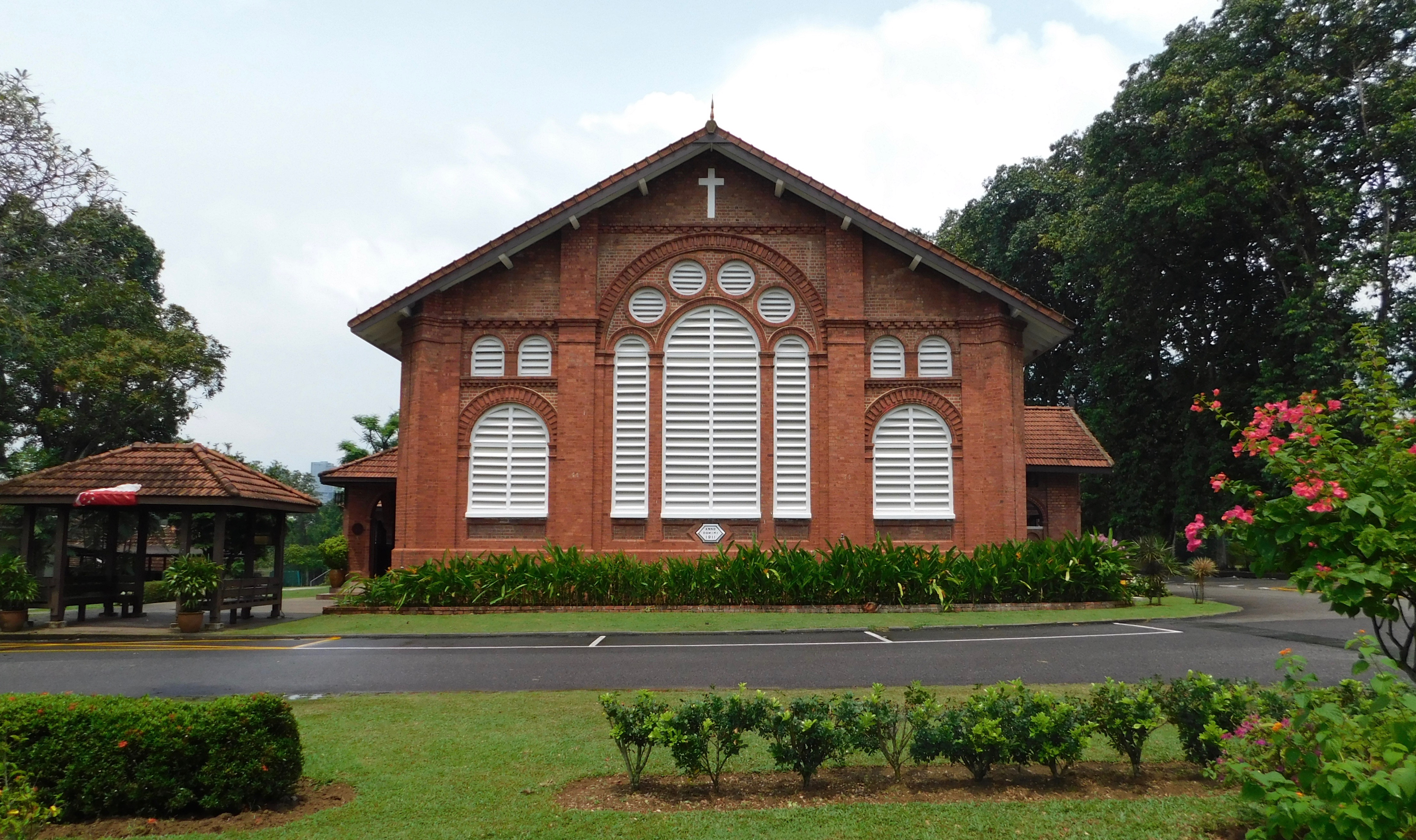
- Church view from Minden Road
- St George’s Church; Singapore
- 1°18′17.39″N 103°48′54.0″E
- Location: 44 Minden Road; Singapore 248816
- Country: Singapore
- Denomination: Anglican
- Website: www.stgeorges.org.sg

History
- Status: Parish church

Architecture
- Heritage designation: National Monument
- Designated: 10 November 1978
- Architect: William H. Stanbury
- Style: Unadorned Romanesque
- Years built: 1910-1913
- Completed: 1913
- Construction cost: £2,000

Administration
- Diocese: Singapore
- Archdeaconry: Singapore

Clergy
- Vicar: Revd. Dr. Jonathan Wong
- Priest: Revd. Joshua Raj

National monument of Singapore
- Designated: 10 November 1978; 47 years ago
- Reference no.: 15

St George's Church (Chinese: 圣乔治教堂; pinyin: Shèng Qiáozhì Jiàotáng) is an Anglican church located on Minden Road in Singapore's Tanglin Area, off Holland Road. Constructed in 1913, the church was built for the British troops stationed in Tanglin Barracks which was once the General Headquarters of the British Far East Land Forces. The church's community comprises members from Singapore and many other countries.

== Leadership ==
St. George's Church is a parish of the Anglican Diocese of Singapore. The present vicar is Revd. Dr Jonathan Wong. He is supported by Revd. Joshua Raj (Priest) and Revd. Jonathan Halliwell (Honorary Deacon).

The previous vicars of the church include Revd. Canon Lewis Lew, Revd. Mark Dickens, Revd. Canon Philip Sinden, Revd. Mervyn Moore (acting vicar), Revd. Loren Fox, Revd. Paul Corrie, Revd. John Benson, Bishop Dudley Foord (interim, vicar), Revd. Bruce Winter, and Revd. Bob Robinson.

== Architecture ==
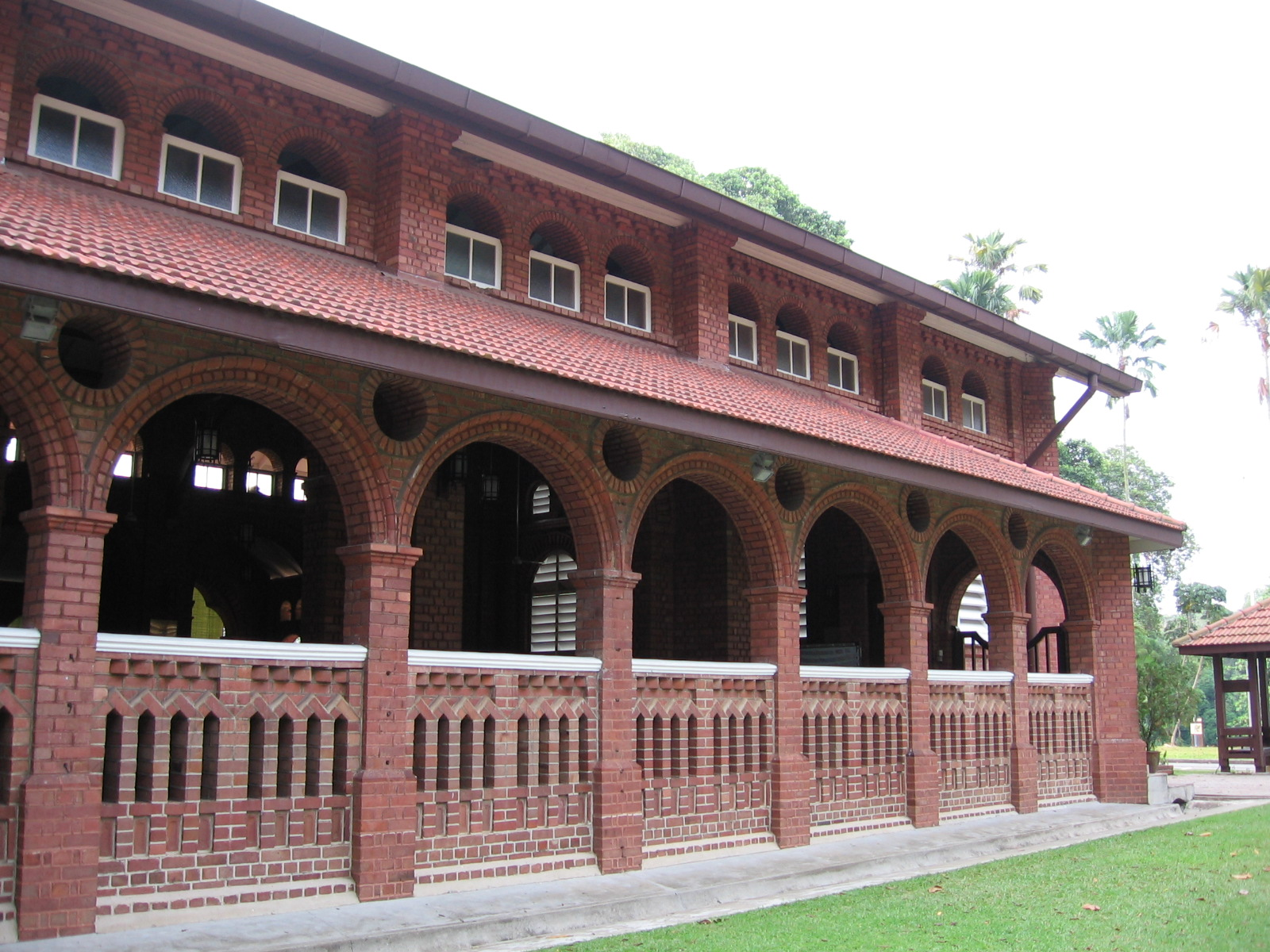
The open arched windows of the church's east side aisle.

The church is a broad, rectangular building. The building composed of red bricks from India which were laid out in intricate patterns but allowed ventilation. It was inspired by the basilica style that prevailed in many parts of 4th and 5th century Europe.

== History ==
St. George's Church was designed by British architect William Henry Stanbury. Construction started in 1910 and finished in 1913, it was built to cater to British soldiers living in the Tanglin barracks. The materials for the church were imported from England and cost £2,000 to build. The church can seat 650.

The land was formerly used as a nutmeg plantation and it included Mount Harriet, a 103-foot high hill on which the church now stands. The land belonged to William E. Willan and was sold in 1865. However, even before the church was built, an ordained minister for the garrison was appointed in 1871.

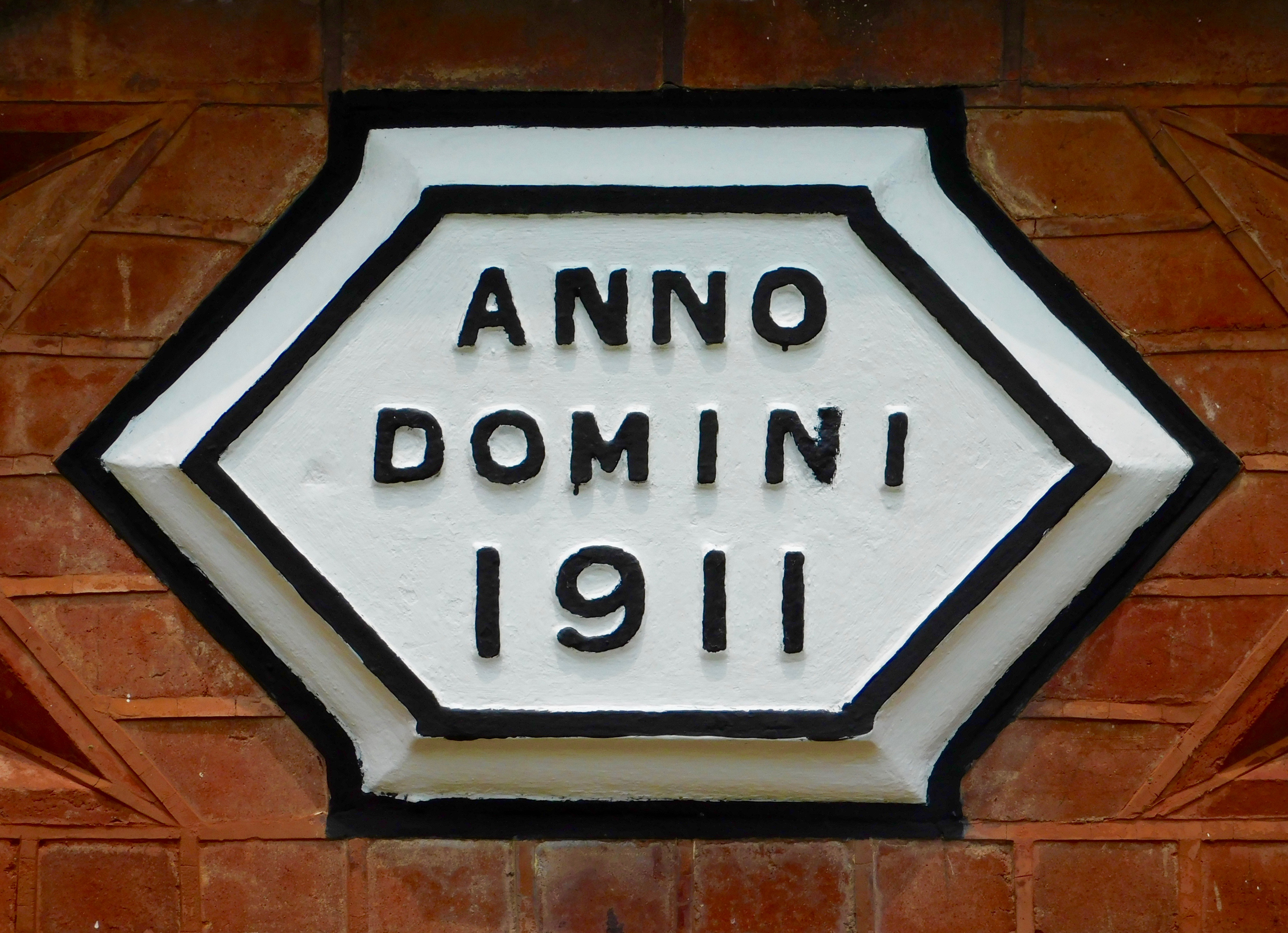
The church's foundation stone.

The current building dates back to 1910 but there was an earlier St. George's built in 1884 near the site of the present church. Both churches were built for the British troops quartered at Tanglin Barracks which was once the General Headquarters of the British Far East Land Forces.

During World War II, the church was used as an ammunition store by the Japanese. The church's original stained glass windows were removed and buried for safe keeping by the church's chaplain. However the chaplain died during the occupation and its location remained unknown. Replacement stained glass windows were installed in 1955. A search for the stained glass windows in 1992 failed to locate the original.

After the British forces withdrew from Singapore in 1968, the place was used by Singapore's Ministry of Defence as its headquarters before it moved to its new premises in Bukit Gombak

St. George's became a civilian church after the British troops left Singapore in 1971. In 1973, it was granted parish status as a community church with a dedicated pastor. It was gazetted a national monument by the National Heritage Board of Singapore on 10 November 1978, and now serves a multinational Christian congregation in Singapore.

In 2017, a hundred-year-old tembusu tree within the church's compound was chopped down as it was struck by lightning over the years and the tree was unhealthy.

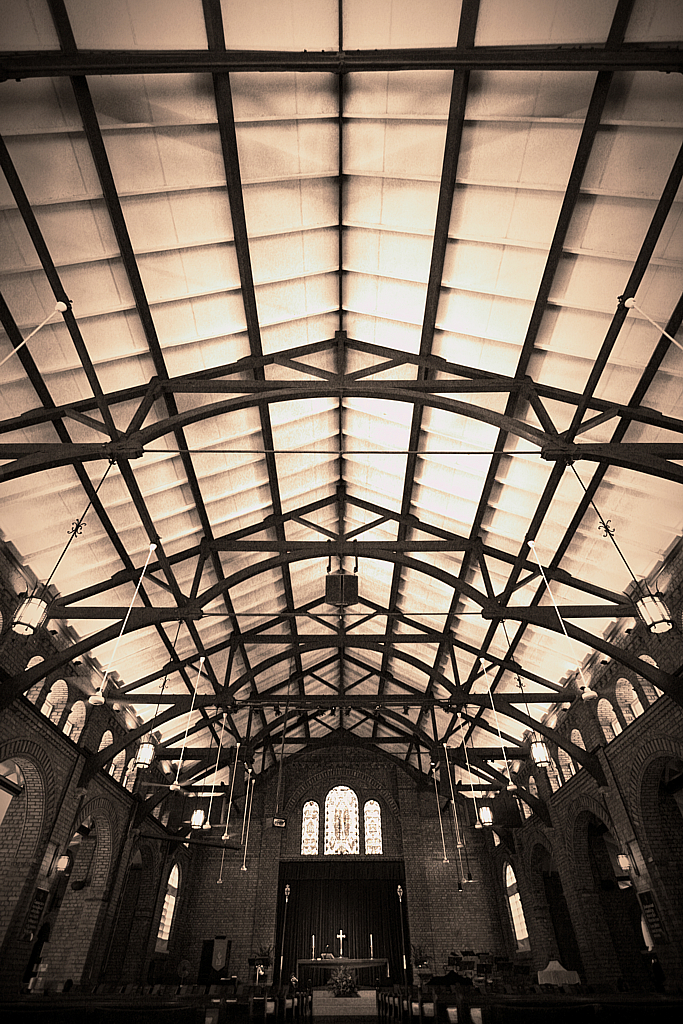
The church's timber roof trusses.

On the outside of the church is a memorial tablet to Major Ivan Lyon D.S.O. M.B.E., who was killed on his second commando raid on military shipping in the Singapore Harbour in October 1944. At the time of the raid, Singapore was more than 1,000 miles inside Imperial Japanese-held territory.

== See also ==
- Anglicanism
- Anglican Communion
- Anglican Diocese of Singapore
- Bishop of Singapore
- Book of Common Prayer
- Christianity in Singapore
- Church of England
- Saint George: Devotions, traditions and prayers
