= Church of the Province of South East Asia =

Ecclesiastical province within the Anglican Communion

Province of the Anglican Church in South East Asia
- Classification: Protestant
- Orientation: Anglican
- Scripture: Holy Bible
- Theology: Anglican doctrine
- Polity: Episcopal
- Primate: Titus Chung
- Headquarters: Singapore
- Territory: Malaysia, Singapore, Brunei, Indonesia, Thailand, Cambodia, Laos, Vietnam and Nepal
- Independence: 1996
- Members: 168,079 (2016)

The Church of the Province in South East Asia is an Anglican church that comprises four dioceses. It is an autonomous member of the Anglican Communion and was established on 2 February 1996 with the dioceses of Kuching, Sabah, Singapore and West Malaysia.

The province covers most of Southeast Asia as well as Nepal apart from Myanmar and the Philippines, and its headquarters is located in Singapore. As of 2016, there are approximately 168,079 Anglicans within the province and the current Metropolitan Archbishop and Primate of the Province is Titus Chung, Bishop of Singapore.

== History ==
=== Early developments ===
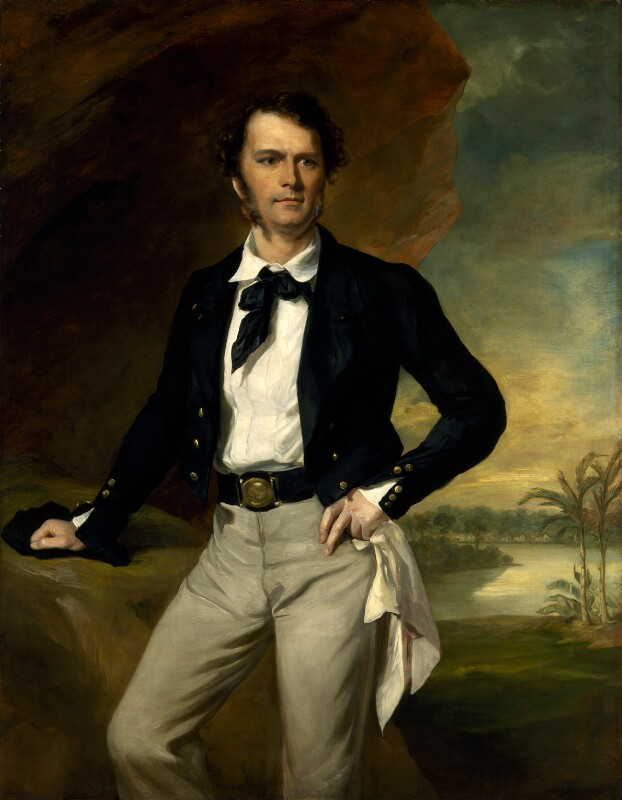
James Brooke, Rajah of Sarawak brought in missionaries in 1848.

Anglicanism was first introduced with the establishment of the British East India Company's settlement of Penang Island in 1786. George Caunter, a local magistrate, was appointed as a Lay Clerk/Acting Chaplain in 1799 under the jurisdiction of the See of Calcutta. In 1819, the first Anglican church building, the Church of St. George the Martyr, was consecrated by the Bishop of Calcutta, Thomas Fanshawe Middleton.

In 1826, the Mission Chapel of the London Missionary Society (LMS) started services in Singapore and the first church building in Singapore was built in 1837. In 1842, a missionary of the LMS started the first girls school in Singapore, now known as St. Margaret's School. The work in Borneo started in 1848 when a group of missionaries led by Francis Thomas McDougall was invited by James Brooke, the Rajah of Sarawak. In 1849, a wooden church was built in Kuching. In 1851, this church was consecrated by Daniel Wilson, Bishop of Calcutta in honour of St. Thomas the Apostle.

=== Establishment of missionary dioceses ===
Letters patent was issued in 1855 to establish the Bishopric of Labuan and McDougall was appointed the first Bishop of Labuan. McDougall was also appointed the Bishop of Sarawak by the Rajah of Sarawak due to the political conventions of the day ruled that no Anglican Diocese might be created outside the limits of the British Empire, and Sarawak was then technically an independent kingdom. This practice prevailed until the Sarawak became a Crown Colony in 1946.

In 1867, The East India Company transferred Penang to the British Crown and with that ended the chaplaincy of the Madras Presidency in Penang. The Anglican churches in Penang, Malacca and Singapore were organised into the Church in the Straits Settlement while remaining under the jurisdiction of the See of Calcutta.

The Church in the Straits Settlement was separated from the See of Calcutta by an Act of Parliament in 1869 and placed under the episcopal care of the Bishop of Labuan as the United Diocese of Singapore, Labuan and Sarawak. In 1909, the United Diocese was further divided into the Diocese of Singapore, the Diocese of Labuan and the Bishopric of Sarawak. The 3 separate Dioceses developed independently from then onwards until the creation of the Province.

=== Anglican work in Malaya and Singapore (1909–1996) ===
The period between the division of the United Diocese and the outbreak of the Second World War in the Pacific, missionary work continued with increasing ordination of local clergy and planting of churches all throughout the Malaya and Singapore.

During the duration of the Second World War, most expatriate clergy and missionaries were interned by the Japanese. Without the benefit of its expatriate clergy, the work of the church fell on the shoulders of local clergy and church workers.

This development highlighted the urgent need for training local leaders for this developing part of the Anglican Church and eventually led to the establishment of Singapore's Trinity Theological College in 1951.

Malaya gained her independence from British rule in 1957. Following this, in 1960, the Diocese was renamed the Diocese of Singapore and Malaya. In 1970, the churches in West Malaysia were separated from the Diocese and reconstituted as the Diocese of West Malaysia by an Act of Parliament and the Diocese was renamed the Diocese of Singapore.

=== Anglican work in British Borneo (1909–1996) ===
Work in British Borneo after the division of the United Diocese until the outbreak of the Second World War followed a similar pattern to the work in Malaya and Singapore. It was supported from 1909 by the Borneo Mission Association. Anglican missionaries were however more successful than their counterparts in Malaya and Singapore in evangelising the indigenous peoples.

Following the devastation of the Second World War, the Diocese of Labuan and the Bishopric of Sarawak was joined together as the Diocese of Borneo and the first bishop, Nigel Cornwall, was consecrated in 1949. In 1962, the Diocese was again divided into the Diocese of Jesselton (later Diocese of Sabah) which included Labuan, and the Diocese of Kuching which included Brunei.

=== Province in South East Asia ===
In 1985, the four Dioceses of West Malaysia, Singapore, Kuching and Sabah requested the Archbishop of Canterbury, George Carey, to create a new province for the region. The request was affirmed by Carey.

In 1996, autocephaly was attained when the Province of the Anglican Church in Southeast Asia consisting of the Dioceses of West Malaysia, Singapore, Kuching and Sabah was established by the Archbishop of Canterbury, George Carey. Moses Tay, Bishop of Singapore, was installed as the first Metropolitan Archbishop of the Province the same year.

On 23 January 2024, Titus Chung, Bishop of Singapore, was installed as the Archbishop of the Province of the Anglican Church in South East Asia at St Andrew's Cathedral in Singapore.

== Membership ==
There are at least 168,079 Anglicans out of an estimated population of 33.9 million.

== Structure ==
The polity of the Church of the Province in South East Asia is episcopalian church governance, which is the same as other Anglican churches. The church maintains a system of geographical parishes organised into dioceses. The Province is divided into four dioceses. Furthermore, the Dioceses of Kuching, West Malaysia and Singapore are further subdivided into archdeaconries and deaneries.

- The Diocese of Kuching
- The Diocese of Sabah
- The Diocese of Singapore
- The Diocese of West Malaysia

=== Current diocesan bishops ===
- Melter Tais – Bishop of Sabah
- Stephen Soe – Bishop of West Malaysia
- Danald Jute – Bishop of Kuching
- Titus Chung – Archbishop of South East Asia and Bishop of Singapore

=== List of primates of South East Asia ===
Archbishops of South East Asia
From	Until	Name	Notes
1996	2000	Moses Tay	b. 1934, also Bishop of Singapore from 1982 to 1999.
2000	2006	Yong Ping Chung PGDK	b. 1941, also Bishop of Sabah from 1990 to 2006.
2006	12 February 2012	John Chew	b. 1947, retired after attaining clerical retirement age; also Bishop of Singapore from 2000 to 2012.
12 February 2012	22 February 2016	Bolly Lapok DPMS PGBK	b. 1952, elected in September 2011; Installed on 12 February 2012. Also Bishop of Kuching from 2007 to 2017.
22 February 2016	9 February 2020	Ng Moon Hing PJN	b. 1955, elected in September 2015; Installed on 22 February 2016. Also Bishop of West Malaysia since 2007.
9 February 2020	23 January 2024	Melter Tais	Elected in September 2019; Installed on 9 February 2020. Also Bishop of Sabah since 2014.
23 January 2024	February 2028	Titus Chung	Elected in September 2023; installed on 23 January 2024. Also Bishop of Singapore since 2020.

== Worship and liturgy ==
The Church of the Province in South East Asia embraces three orders of ministry: deacon, priest, and bishop. A local variant of the Book of Common Prayer is used.

== Doctrine and practice ==
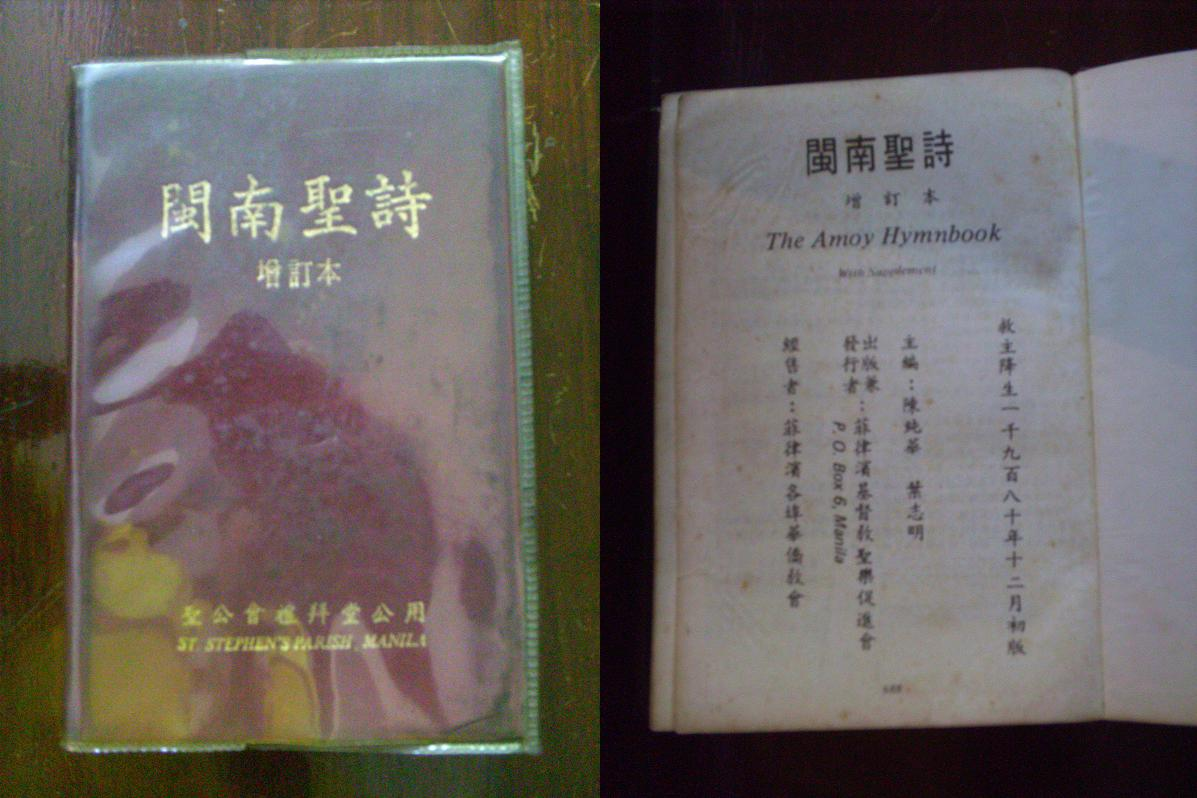
The Amoy Hymnal published by St. Stephen's Parish, Manila, Philippines

The center of the Church of the Province in South East Asia's teaching is the life and resurrection of Jesus Christ. The basic teachings of the church, or catechism, includes:

- Jesus Christ is fully human and fully God. He died and was resurrected from the dead.
- Jesus provides the way of eternal life for those who believe.
- The Old and New Testaments of the Bible were written by people "under the inspiration of the Holy Spirit". The Apocrypha are additional books that are used in Christian worship, but not for the formation of doctrine.
- The two great and necessary sacraments are Holy Baptism and Holy Eucharist
- Other sacramental rites are confirmation, ordination, marriage, reconciliation of a penitent, and unction.
- Belief in heaven, hell, and Jesus's return in glory.

The threefold sources of authority in Anglicanism are scripture, tradition, and reason. These three sources uphold and critique each other in a dynamic way. This balance of scripture, tradition and reason is traced to the work of Richard Hooker, a sixteenth-century apologist. In Hooker's model, scripture is the primary means of arriving at doctrine and things stated plainly in scripture are accepted as true. Issues that are ambiguous are determined by tradition, which is checked by reason.

=== Ecumenical relations ===
The dioceses of the Church of the Province in South East Asia participate in the ecumenical World Council of Churches via their respective national church councils:

- Council of Churches of Malaysia
  - Diocese of Kuching and Brunei
  - Diocese of Sabah
  - Diocese of West Malaysia
- National Council of Churches of Singapore
  - Diocese of Singapore

However, unlike many other Anglican churches, the Church of the Province in South East Asia is not a member of the World Council of Churches in its own right.

== Anglican realignment ==
Together with the Church of the Province of Rwanda, the Church of the Province in South East Asia maintained a missionary organisation, the Anglican Mission in the Americas, in the United States and Canada, from 2000 to 2011. The Church of the Province in South East Asia has been active in the Anglican realignment, as member of the Global South and the Global Anglican Future Conference. The province was represented at the GAFCON III, held on 17–22 June 2018, in Jerusalem, by a 18 members delegation, coming from Malaysia, Singapore and Cambodia.

Although the province is generally regarded as conservative, in 2025, its Primate Titus Chung stated that he was concerned about the direction of the Global Fellowship of Confessing Anglicans (GAFCON) and affirmed that the province intended to remain within the Anglican Communion.

== See also ==
- Christianity in Malaysia
- Christianity in Singapore
