= Bishop of Sabah =

- Bishopric

Anglican
- Incumbent: Melter Tais

Location
- Country: Malaysia
- Territory: Sabah and the Federal Territory of Labuan
- Ecclesiastical province: South East Asia
- Archdeaconries: 3

Information
- First holder: Francis Thomas McDougall
- Established: 1855, current establishment in 1966
- Cathedral: All Saints' Cathedral

The Bishop of Sabah is an Anglican prelate who oversees the Diocese of Sabah in the Church of the Province of South East Asia. Following the death of Albert Vun Cheong Fui on 14 July 2014, Melter Tais was installed as the sixth bishop on 14 May 2015. His seat is All Saints' Cathedral, Kota Kinabalu.

== History ==
Anglican worship in the territory administered by the diocese today began as early as 1846 when the Lieutenant Governor of Labuan, John Scott, was given authority by the Bishop of London to perform burials and weddings using the 1662 Book of Common Prayer.

The Revd Dr Francis McDougall was one of the first group of Anglican missionaries to arrive on the island of Borneo in 1847. He laboured in the ministry from his base in Kuching. In 1855, McDougall was consecrated in Calcutta as the Bishop of Labuan and its Dependencies. Bishop McDougall continued to operate, however, from Kuching, the title of his bishopric being due to the then Church of England’s practice of only setting up a diocese in a Crown possession, which Labuan was, while the Kingdom of Sarawak under Rajah James Brooke was not.

The first church in the present-day diocese, the Church of Our Holy Saviour, Labuan was built and consecrated by the bishop on 18 December 1866.

The diocese then included Anglican churches in the Labuan, North Borneo, and Sarawak. With the transfer of jurisdiction of the Anglican churches in the Straits Settlements from the Diocese of Calcutta to the diocese, it was renamed the Diocese of Labuan, Sarawak and Singapore in 1869. In 1909, the Straits Settlements was separated from to form its own diocese and the diocese was renamed the Diocese of Labuan and Sarawak. In 1949, the diocese was again renamed the Diocese of Borneo.

In 1962, the diocese was divided into the Diocese of Jesselton and the Diocese of Kuching. The Diocese of Jesselton was renamed the Diocese of Sabah in 1968 after the renaming of the Jesselton to Kota Kinabalu and to reflect the new political situation after the formation of Malaysia.

In 2015, the first native Sabahan of Kadazan-Dusun descent, Melter Tais, was consecrated the Bishop of Sabah.

== List of bishops ==
Bishop of Labuan and its Dependencies
From	Until	Incumbent	Notes
1856	1869	Francis McDougall	
Bishops of Labuan, Sarawak and Singapore
From	Until	Incumbent	Notes
1869	1881	Walter Chambers	Churches in the Straits Settlements separated from the Diocese of Calcutta and placed under the Diocese of Labuan and Sarawak. Diocese renamed Diocese of Labuan, Sarawak and Singapore.
1882	1908	George Hose	
Bishops of Labuan and Sarawak
From	Until	Incumbent	Notes
1909	1916	Rupert Mounsey	Churches in Singapore were separated from the Diocese to form its own Diocese of Singapore. The Diocese reverted to the name of Diocese of Labuan and Sarawak.
1917	1931	Logie Danson	
1932	1937	Noel Hudson	
1938	1948	Francis Hollis	
Bishop of Borneo
From	Until	Incumbent	Notes
1948	1962	Nigel Cornwall	The diocese was renamed the Diocese of Borneo and included Anglican missions in Kalimantan.
Bishops of Jesselton
From	Until	Incumbent	Notes
1962	1964	James Wong Chang Ling	The diocese was separated into the Diocese of Jesselton and the Diocese of Kuching.
1965	1968	Roland Koh Peck Chiang	
Bishops of Sabah
From	Until	Incumbent	Notes
1968	1970	Roland Koh Peck Chiang	The diocese was renamed the Diocese of Sabah; Koh was translated to West Malaysia
1971	1990	Luke Chhoa Heng Sze	
1990	2006	Yong Phing Chung	Archbishop of South East Asia, 2000–2006
2006	2014	Albert Vun Cheong Fui	
2015	present	Melter Tais	First native Sabahan to be appointed Bishop; Archbishop of South East Asia since 2020

Yong Chen Fah (1943–2021) (younger brother to Yong Phing Chung) was made Assistant Bishop in 1998 and seconded to the Anglican Diocese of Sydney in 2006 and retired upon turning 65 in 2008.

== See also ==
- Diocese of Sabah
- Church of the Province of South East Asia
- Diocese of Kuching
- Diocese of West Malaysia
- Diocese of Singapore
- Anglicanism
- Anglican Communion
