= Rennis Ponniah =

Rennis Ponniah (潘仁义); is a Singaporean Anglican retired Bishop. He was the 9th Bishop of Singapore. He succeeded Bishop John Chew on his retirement on 4 October 2012. He was also the president of the National Council of Churches of Singapore from 2016 to 2018. He retired in 2020 and was succeeded by Titus Chung.

== Education ==
Ponniah studied in the National University of Singapore and received a Bachelor of Social Science degree; and a Master's in Divinity from Trinity Theological College, Singapore.

== Priesthood ==
In 1990, Ponniah was ordained as a deacon at St Andrew's Cathedral and in 1991, he was ordained as a priest. On 4 May 2005, he was consecrated as the Assistant Bishop of Singapore. Prior to becoming the Anglican Bishop of Singapore, he was Vicar of St John's - St Margaret's Church.
