= Melter Tais =

Anglican bishop

The Most Reverend Datuk Melter Jiki Tais
- Archbishop and Primate of the Church of the Province of South East Asia; Bishop of Sabah
- Province: Church of the Province of South East Asia
- Diocese: Diocese of Sabah
- Installed: 9 February 2020 (as Archbishop and Primate of the Church of the Province of South East Asia); 2015 (as Bishop of Sabah)
- Term ended: 23 January 2024 (as archbishop)
- Predecessor: Ng Moon Hing (as Archbishop of the Church of the Province of South East Asia); Albert Vun Cheong Fui (as Bishop of Sabah)
- Successor: Titus Chung (as archbishop)

Orders
- Ordination: 1993
- Consecration: 2015

Personal details
- Born: Sabah
- Denomination: Anglican

Melter Jiki Tais is the Anglican Bishop of Sabah and was the sixth archbishop and primate of the Church of the Province of South East Asia from 2020 to 2024. In 2015, he became the first native of Sabah to be installed as bishop of that diocese.

== Ecclesiastical career ==
The archbishop was ordained to the priesthood in 1993 and was appointed to many positions in the Diocese of Sabah, including Priest-in-Charge of St Margaret’s Church in Keningau and St Peter’s Church in Tenom, Rector of St Mark’s Church in Lahad Datu and St Luke’s Mission District in Telupid.

As of August 2026, he became a partner bishop for the Anglican Missionary Society Global, which became partnered with the Evangelical Episcopal Communion.
