= Titus Chung =

Singaporean Anglican bishop and 10th Bishop of Singapore

The Most Reverend Titus Chung Khiam Boon
- Archbishop of the Province of South East Asia; Bishop of Singapore
- Church: Church of the Province of South East Asia
- Diocese: Singapore
- In office: 2024–present (as archbishop); 2020–present (as diocesan bishop)
- Predecessor: Melter Tais (as archbishop); Rennis Ponniah (as diocesan bishop)
- Previous posts: Vicar of the Chapel of the Holy Spirit (1997-2005); Priest-in-Charge of St. Andrew's Cathedral's Mandarin Congregation (2005-2020)

Orders
- Ordination: 1997 (priest)
- Consecration: 2020 by John Chew; Kuan Kim Seng

Personal details
- Born: 1964 or 1965 Singapore
- Denomination: Anglican
- Spouse: Mrs Connie Chung
- Children: 2

Titus Chung
- Traditional Chinese: 章劍文
- Simplified Chinese: 章剑文
Transcriptions
Standard Mandarin
- Hanyu Pinyin: Zhāng Jiànwén

Titus Chung Khiam Boon (Chinese: 章剑文) is the archbishop of the Anglican Church of the Province of South East Asia and the 10th Bishop of Singapore. He is a systematic theologian who serves at St. Andrew's Cathedral, Singapore. He was ordained in 1997 in the Diocese of Singapore after graduating from Trinity Theological College. Chung was installed for a four-year term as the seventh archbishop of the Province of South East Asia at St Andrew's Cathedral (Singapore) on 23 January 2024.

== Early life and education ==
Chung studied at Trinity Theological College; and then University of Edinburgh. He received a Doctorate in Philosophy from the latter and his doctorate dissertation was on the Scottish theologian, Thomas F. Torrance's theory of divine revelation.

== Priesthood ==
Prior to Chung's ordination in 1997, he graduated from Trinity Theological College, Singapore. Thereafter, he became a priest and later, Vicar of the Chapel of the Holy Spirit from 1997 to 2005, before being Priest-in-charge of St Andrew's Cathedral’s Mandarin congregation.

Before Chung's installation as the Bishop of Singapore, he taught part-time at his alma mater, Trinity Theological College and at the same time, was the Convenor of Continuing Ministerial Education for Clergy and Deaconesses of the diocese and a member of the Senior Clergy Planning Team.

On 18 October 2020, Chung was installed as the 10th Bishop of Singapore at St Andrew's Cathedral.

As the Diocesan Bishop of Singapore, Chung holds office and chairmanship in various organisations and institutions of the Anglican Church such as the training institute of the diocese, St Peter's Hall and Anglican schools such as St Andrew's School, Singapore.

== Archbishop of the Church of the Province of South East Asia ==
At the Extraordinary Provincial Synod of 2023, Chung has been elected as the next Archbishop of the Church of the Province of South East Asia. He will succeed the incumbent Anglican Primate of the province, the Most Reverend Datuk Melter Jiki Tais in 2024. Chung's installation service as the 7th Archbishop of the Province was held on 23 January 2024 at St Andrew's Cathedral, Singapore.

== Views ==
=== Evangelism ===
In an official statement on 12 November 2022, Chung emphasised evangelism.

=== Sexuality and same-sex marriages ===
In a pastoral letter, Chung, along with all other bishops in the Church of the Province of South East Asia affirm a conservative theological stance on the issue of same-sex unions. They assert that marriage, according to Scripture, is solely between one man and one woman. They expressed disagreement with the recent decision of the Church of England to permit blessings for same-sex civil unions.

== Personal life ==
Chung is married to Connie Chung and they have two sons their twenties, Theodore and Thaddeus.

Anglican Communion titles
Preceded by Melter Tais	Archbishop and Primate of the Church of the Province of South East Asia; 2024–present	Incumbent
Preceded by Rennis Ponniah	Bishop of Singapore; 2020–present	Incumbent
