= Edward Norman (bishop) =

New Zealand bishop

The Most Reverend Sir Edward Norman KBE DSO MC
- Diocese: Wellington
- In office: 1973–1987
- Predecessor: Henry Baines
- Successor: Brian Davis
- Other posts: Curate in Berwick-on-Tweed; Archdeacon of Wellington

Orders
- Ordination: 1948 as priest 1973 as bishop

Personal details
- Born: Edward Kinsella Norman; 14 September 1916 Napier, New Zealand
- Died: 8 March 1987 (aged 70)
- Denomination: Anglican
- Occupation: Anglican bishop
- Profession: Cleric
- Education: Auckland University College

Sir Edward Kinsella Norman KBE DSO MC (14 September 1916 – 8 March 1987) was a decorated New Zealand army officer in World War II followed by service as an Anglican priest culminating in his appointment as the Anglican bishop of Wellington, New Zealand.

== Early life ==
Norman was born in Napier, New Zealand in 1916. His education at Auckland University (then still Auckland College of the University of New Zealand) was interrupted by World War II.

== World War II ==
Norman served with the 25th Battalion, 2nd New Zealand Division. He was acting commander of the battalion from December 1943 to February 1944, and was its permanent commander from June 1944 to April 1945 when he was wounded by a landmine and medically evacuated.

== Honours and awards ==
Military Cross (25 November 1943)

Distinguished Service Order (2 May 1946)

Legion of Merit (USA) (23 May 1947)

Knight Commander of the Order of the British Empire

== Later life ==
In 1948, Norman was ordained and was a curate in Berwick-on-Tweed; he later became vicar of Waiwhetu. After further incumbencies at Levin, Tauranga and Karori he became Archdeacon of Wellington in 1969 and the diocesan bishop in 1973. He died on 8 March 1987.

== Sources ==
- Puttick, Sir Edward (1960). 25 Battalion. Official History of New Zealand in the Second World War 1939–45. Wellington, New Zealand: War History Branch. OCLC 173284792.

Church of England titles
Preceded by Henry Baines	Bishop of Wellington; 1973–1987	Succeeded by Brian Davis
