= Moses Tay =

Singaporean Anglican archbishop (1938–2026)

Moses Tay Leng Kong (Chinese: 鄭靈光; 14 June 1938 – 24 September 2026) was a Singaporean Anglican bishop. He was the seventh Bishop of Singapore from 1982 to 2000 and the first Archbishop of the Province of Anglican Church in South East Asia from 1996 to 2000.

== Education ==
Tay was educated in medicine at the University of Singapore.

== Medical career ==
Tay practiced medicine in Malaysia for eight years.

In early 1982, Tay was posted as director of the Tan Tock Seng Hospital, following the career path that the Ministry of Health had charted, but a few months later tendered his resignation to be appointed the Bishop of Singapore.

== Priesthood ==
Tay was Dean of the Diocese of Singapore from 1974 to 1982. In 1982, Tay was installed as the 7th Bishop of Singapore.

Philip Jenkins noted that when Tay visited Stanley Park in Vancouver in the early 1990s, he was deeply troubled by the totem poles he saw there. He concluded that "as artifacts of an alien religion, these were idols possessed by evil spirits, and they required handling by prayer and exorcism." Jenkins goes on to suggest that this behavior "horrified the local Anglican church," which "regarded exorcism as an absurd superstition."

On 2 February 1996, Tay was installed as archbishop of Province of South East Asia.

He was involved in founding the Anglican Mission in the Americas in the late 1990s to give support to orthodox Anglicans in North America. He was involved in the consecration of Chuck Murphy and John H. Rodgers Jr. as their bishops in 2000.

In 2000, Tay stepped down as Bishop of Singapore and handed over his office to John Chew.

Tay was one of the most outspoken voices in the Anglican Communion in opposition to the theological liberalism of the Episcopal Church of the United States.

== Death ==
Tay died on 24 September 2026, at the age of 88.

== Bibliography ==
- Born for Blessings: An Autobiography of Moses Tay, Armour Publishing, 2009, ISBN 978-981422287-7

Anglican Communion titles
Preceded by Chiu Ban It	Bishop of Singapore; 1982–1999	Succeeded by John Chew
New creation	Archbishop of South East Asia; 1996–2000	Succeeded by Datuk Yong Ping Chung
