= John Chew =

Singaporean Anglican bishop (born 1947)

John Chew Hiang Chea
- Archbishop of the Province of Anglican Church in South East Asia, Bishop of Singapore, Primate
- In office: 2006 — 2012
- Predecessor: Yong Ping Chung
- Successor: Bolly Lapok
- Previous post: Bishop of Singapore (2000-2012)

Orders
- Ordination: 1976 (deacon); 1978 (priest)
- Consecration: 2000 by Datuk Yong Ping Chung, Bishop of Sabah

Personal details
- Born: 4 October 1947 (age 79) Singapore, Straits Settlements, British Empire
- Spouse: Christina
- Children: 1

John Chew Hiang Chea (Chinese: 周贤正; born 4 October 1947) was the third Metropolitan Archbishop and Primate of the Province of Anglican Church in South East Asia as well as Bishop of Singapore. He retired as the 8th Bishop of Singapore on 4 October 2012. He was succeeded by Rennis Ponniah.

== Early life and education ==
Chew was the fifth child out of six children in his family. His mother worked at the Singapore Anti-Tuberculosis Association and his father worked in the family business.

Chew studied at Catholic High School and Anglican High School. He then majored in government and public administration at Nanyang University and received his Bachelor of Arts (BA) in 1969, honours in 1970 and Masters in 1976. He obtained his Bachelor of Divinity (BD) with honours from the University of London in 1976.

In 1982, Chew obtained his Doctor of Philosophy (PhD) in Old Testament Studies from the University of Sheffield.

== Career ==
After graduation from Nanyang University, Chew worked as an assistant director in the Defence Ministry in 1971. He then worked for three years as an administrative assistant at the Ministry of Science and Technology.

After his studies at the University of Sheffield, Chew returned to Singapore and worked at the Trinity Theological College as a lecturer in 1981 and became its principal in 1991. He remained as principal until 1999 where he resigned to become the Bishop of Singapore. In 2006, he served as the chairman on the Board of Governors.

== Priesthood ==
On 6 November 1976, Chew was ordained as deacon at St Andrew's Cathedral and on 8 October 1978, he was ordained as priest. On 4 May 1986, he was collated as Canon.

Chew was consecrated and enthroned as the 8th Bishop of Singapore by the Most Reverend Datuk Yong Ping Chung, the Archbishop of the Province of the Anglican Church in South East Asia and Bishop of Sabah, on 25 April 2000 at St Andrew's Cathedral. His consecration service was attended by Deputy Prime Minister of Singapore Tony Tan, dignitaries, bishops from the various dioceses and religious leaders from both fellow Christian denominations and non-Christian religions as well.

On 5 February 2006, Chew was installed as the 3rd Archbishop of the Province of the Anglican Church in South East Asia as Datuk Yong Ping Chung, the Bishop of the Anglican Diocese of Sabah has reached retirement age. Representatives of Rowan Williams, Archbishop of Canterbury (including Jonathan Gledhill, Bishop of Lichfield); Nicholas Chia, Roman Catholic Archbishop of Singapore; Robert M. Solomon, Bishop of the Methodist Church in Singapore; and Ong Chit Chung, Member of Parliament of Jurong GRC were present at the occasion.

As Bishop of Singapore, Chew was against the setting up of casinos in Integrated resorts in Singapore.

In 2012, Chew stepped down as Bishop of Singapore and Archbishop of Southeast Asia as he reached retirement age.

On 12 February 2012, Chew handed over his office as the Archbishop of the Province of Anglican Church in Southeast Asia to the Bishop of the Diocese of Kuching, Datuk Bolly Lapok. Lapok succeeded Chew as the fourth Provincial Archbishop at an Installation Service held in St Thomas’ Cathedral, Kuching.

Chew continued to serve in the Diocese of Singapore as her Diocesan Bishop after that. On 9 September, Chew launched the special bilingual edition of the English Standard Version- Revised Chinese Union Version Pew Bible to be used during Worship Services in St Andrew's Cathedral to mark her 150th Consecration Anniversary of the Nave.

On 28 September, a Thanksgiving Service was held in St Andrew's Cathedral, Singapore in honour of his faithful service to the Diocese of Singapore for the past 12 years. Bishops from the region, Church leaders in Singapore and many Anglican Church members attended the Service. Chew retired as the 8th Bishop of Singapore on 4 October 2012.

== Presently serving as ==
- (Since 2000) President, Fellowship of Evangelical Students, Singapore
- (Since 2000) President, National Council of Churches of Singapore
- (Since 2005) Honorary President, Bible Society of Singapore
- (Since 2003) Honorary Secretary/ Chairman, Anglican Global South Primates' Network
- (2007 - 2011) Chairman, Council of Church of East Asia
- (2007 - 2009) Member, Anglican Covenant Design Group
- (2000 - 2012) Chairman, Board of Governors, Trinity Theological College, Singapore

== Personal life ==
Chew married Swee Kin, a teacher in 1972, and they have a son.

== See also ==
- Former Bishops of Singapore
- Anglican Diocese of Singapore

Anglican Communion titles
| Preceded by Moses Tay | Bishop of Singapore; 2000–2012 | Succeeded by Rennis Ponniah |
| Preceded by Datuk Yong Ping Chung | Archbishop of South East Asia; 2006–2012 | Succeeded by Datuk Bolly Lapok |
