= Terry Kee Buck Hwa =

Terry Kee Buck Hwa is a former Bishop of the Lutheran Church in Singapore and a Vice-President of the National Council of Churches of Singapore. He also served as president of the National Council of Churches of Singapore from 2012 to 2014.

== Education ==
Kee studied in Singapore Bible College for his Bachelor of Theology degree. He obtained his Masters in Pastoral Care and Counselling in 2007 at China Lutheran Seminary in Taiwan.

== Service in the Lutheran Church ==
Kee was pastor of Bedok Lutheran Church, Jurong Christian Church, Lutheran Church of Our Redeemer and Queenstown Lutheran Church. He also served as a missionary to Thailand.

== Involvement in Inter-faith Efforts ==
Kee has been involved in Interfaith dialogue in Singapore, as a representative of Christianity the Inter-Religious Organisation in Singapore. Kee has visited different religious organisations as a representative of the Christian faith. In 2017, when a Muslim imam made inappropriate remarks against Christians and Jews, Kee was among the 30 religious representatives present when the imam made his apology.

== Jurong Church Hub ==
The building of Jurong Christian Church was a two-storey brick building since 1967. In 2007, the church was given notices by government authorities to reinforce some of its columns and beams to continue its operations. Kee decided to rebuild the church building to test his church hub concept that he had been discussing with the local authorities to mitigate the scarcity of land available for religious use in Singapore.

In January 2014, Kee, in his capacity as the Bishop of the Lutheran Church, led a project to build a church building that housed 6 churches from different denominations.
