= Diocese of Sabah =

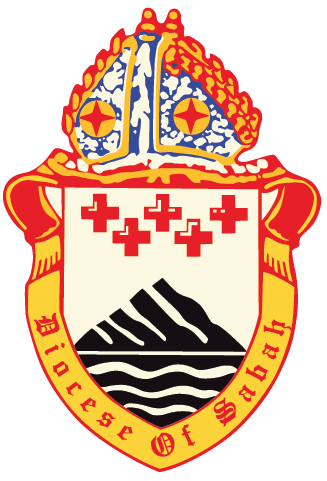
- Arms of the Diocese of Sabah

Location
- Country: Malaysia
- Territory: Sabah, Labuan
- Ecclesiastical province: Province of South East Asia
- Archdeaconries: West Coast and Labuan Archdeaconry; Central Archdeaconry; East Coast Archdeaconry

Statistics
- Area: 73,992 km^{2} (28,568 sq mi)(not including missions in Indonesia, Peninsular Malaysia, and Thailand)
- Churches: 63

Information
- Denomination: Anglican
- Cathedral: All Saints' Cathedral, Kota Kinabalu

Current leadership
- Bishop: Rt Revd Datuk Melter Jiki Tais
- Suffragans: Kenneth Thien, Sabah West; John Yeo, Sabah South

Website
- anglicansabah.org

The Diocese of Sabah is an Anglican diocese which covers Sabah and Labuan in Malaysia. Founded in 1962, the see was originally part of the much larger Diocese of Labuan and its Dependencies which was established in 1855. Following the carving out of the Diocese of Singapore in 1909 from this last ecclesiastical territory, the area of the present-day Diocese fell under the jurisdiction of the Diocese of Labuan and Sarawak, which was reorganised as the Diocese of Borneo in 1949. In 1962, the latter diocese was divided into two, forming the Diocese of Kuching and the Diocese of Jesselton, which was renamed the Diocese of Sabah when the capital city was given the new name of Kota Kinabalu in 1967.

The territorial jurisdiction of the diocese covers the entire 73,904 km^{2} of Sabah and the 92 km^{2} of Labuan. Besides this, the Diocese also has a few mission churches in other parts of the Province of South East Asia, including in Indonesia and Thailand.

The current Bishop of Sabah is the Right Reverend Datuk Melter Jiki bin Tais, the first Bumiputera (indigenous) person to hold the office and a senior clergyman of ethnic Kadazan-Dusun descent.

== History ==
=== 19th century ===
==== Beginning of mission work ====
The history of the Diocese of Sabah begins with the mission work which was carried out in the crown colony of Labuan and British North Borneo. In 1846, the island of Labuan was ceded to Great Britain by the Sultanate of Brunei as the result of the Treaty of Labuan. As there was no resident Anglican priest in Labuan, the Bishop of London granted the Lieutenant Governor, John Scott, the authority to perform weddings and funerals using the 1662 Book of Common Prayer.

Among the first Anglican missionaries sent to Borneo in 1846 was the Revd Dr Francis Thomas McDougall, a priest, medical doctor and surgeon. Although his base was in Kuching, Sarawak, technicalities in canon law led to him being consecrated as the Bishop of Labuan and its Dependencies in 1855. The Church of Our Holy Saviour, Labuan which was the first Anglican church in the present-day Diocese of Sabah, was consecrated by Bishop McDougall in 1866, although there is evidence of a congregation on the island since 1850.

In 1878, Baron von Overbeck, the Austrian Consul in Hong Kong, and Alfred Dent, a British entrepreneur, obtained territorial possession of what became British North Borneo. The North Borneo Chartered Company was set up to administer this region. The Englishman William Burgess Pryer was appointed "Resident" of the East Coast. He founded the town of Sandakan in 1879. A committed Anglican, Pryer requested ministerial assistance from the then-Bishop of Labuan, George Frederick Hose. Bishop Hose was unable to visit Sandakan until 1884 but in 1883 sent a Chinese catechist, Ah Leng, to minister to the Chinese-speaking Christians in Kudat as well as Sandakan.

==== First two churches in North Borneo ====
The first priest sent to North Borneo was the Revd William Henry Elton, a missionary of the Society for the Propagation of the Gospel in Foreign Parts (SPG). Arriving in Sandakan in 1888, he found a suitable piece of land to build the first Anglican church in present-day Sabah, St. Michael's and All Angels Church, Sandakan. He also set up St Michael's Boys' School and St Monica's Girls' School.

The first capital of British North Borneo was Kudat. Groups of Hakka Christians were brought over from China to farm the surrounding area. Although they had been evangelised by disparate denominations back in China, Elton managed to convince them to form a single congregation. Thus, St James' Anglican Church, Kudat was born. The first Asian priest in North Borneo, the Revd Fong Hau Kong, was ordained deacon in 1898 and priest in 1910 having served as a catechist in Kudat.

=== 20th century ===
==== Expansion on the coasts ====
The port town of Jesselton was founded in 1899. Elton swiftly secured land for a church, and the SPG sent a missionary priest, the Revd George Clarke, to the area in 1902. By 1914 the mission included a boys' school, known later as All Saints' School, St Agnes' Girls School and All Saints' Parish Church.

In the southeastern town of Tawau, the church of St Patrick's was finally established in 1917, 18 years after Revd Elton's first visit to the town in 1899. The first resident priest, Revd Vun Nen Vun, was a graduate of the short-lived but notable College of the Holy Way in Kudat, an experiment in educating local clergy.

==== World War II and aftermath ====
Mission work in the region was severely affected by the Second World War. The Japanese army's assault on North Borneo began on 27 December 1941, and by the end of February they had taken over the territory. Foreign clergy and other missionaries were interned, including Sisters Irene and Alison from the Community of the Companions of Jesus the Good Shepherd, who were serving as teachers in Sandakan. Into the vacuum created by the imprisonment of the missionaries stepped the few local clergy, including the five graduates of the College of the Holy Way, namely the Revd Chin Phu Yin, the Revd Chong En Siong, the Revd Lai Chun Sang, the Revd Lim Siong Teck and the Revd Vun Nen Vun. Christians suffered persecution during the Japanese occupation as they were adherents of a faith considered to be "Western." Nevertheless, most held on to their faith during this difficult time.

North Borneo was liberated by the Allied Forces in October 1945. Much had to be done to rebuild the church both in a physical as well as a spiritual sense. The Rt Revd Nigel Cornwall, the newly-appointed Bishop of Borneo, managed to secure assistance in the form of missionary nurses, priests and teachers from the Australian Board of Missions and the Australian branch of the Church Mission Society.

==== The Sabah Anglican Interior Mission (SAIM) ====
Throughout the first seventy years of Anglican mission work in North Borneo, the focus had been on the coastal areas which were generally urban or semi-urban. An attempt to evangelise the peoples of the interior was started in Keningau in 1896, but this work among the Murut people had to be abandoned in 1902 due to the ill-health and transfer to Singapore of pioneer missionary the Revd Fred Perry.

Work in the interior resumed in earnest in 1958 with the founding of the Sabah Anglican Interior Mission (SAIM). The initial impetus behind the SAIM came from Bruce Sandilands, a district surveyor who was moved by the poverty he encountered during his trips along rivers which reached deep into the interior, such as the Kinabatangan. He convinced the Rector of St Michael's Sandakan, the Revd Canon Frank Lomax, to accompany him upriver. Lomax was similarly moved by the difficulties faced by the rural villagers, and thus the SAIM was conceived and born to uplift the spiritual and material well-being of the peoples in the interior.

== Archdeaconries ==
- West Coast and Labuan (West Coast & Kudat Divisions, Labuan)
- Central (Interior Division)
- East Coast (Sandakan & Tawau Divisions)

== Bishops ==
Bishops of Sabah
No.	From	Until	Incumbent	Notes
1	24 July 1962	30 September 1964	James Wong Chang Ling	As Bishop of Jesselton (Sabah)
2	12 March 1965	22 March 1970	Tan Sri Roland Koh Peck Chiang	As Bishop of Jesselton (Sabah)
3	25 January 1972	20 April 1990	Datuk Luke Chhoa Heng Sze	
4	25 September 1990	19 February 2006	Datuk Yong Ping Chung	Also primate of the Church of the Province of South East Asia from 2000 to 2006
5	25 April 2006	15 July 2014	Datuk Albert Vun Cheong Fui	Died in office
6	19 May 2015	Present	Datuk Melter Jiki bin Tais	Since 25 May 2025 also concurrently Area Bishop of Sabah East

=== Area Bishops ===
Area Bishop of Sabah West
No.	From	Until	Incumbent	Notes
1	25 May 2025	Present	Kenneth Thien	Previously canon of All Saints' Cathedral, Kota Kinabalu. Consecrated as Assistant Bishop of Sabah on 27 November 2025, installed as Area Bishop of Sabah West on 25 May 2025.

Area Bishop of Sabah South
No.	From	Until	Incumbent	Notes
1	25 May 2025	Present	John Yeo	Consecrated as Assistant Bishop of Sabah on 15 August 2011, installed as Area Bishop of Sabah South on 25 May 2025.

== See also ==
- Anglican Communion
- Anglicanism
