= Chiu Ban It =

Bishop of Singapore from 1966 to 1981

Joshua Chiu Ban It (周万一; 1918 – 9 November 2016) was the Bishop of Singapore from 1966 to 1981, and was the first indigenous Bishop of Singapore.

Chiu was born in 1918. He graduated with a Bachelor of Laws from the University of London in 1941 and after a period of study at Westcott House, Cambridge in 1943, was ordained deacon in 1945 and priest in 1946. His first post was as Curate at St Francis, Bournville after which he was Priest in charge of St Hilda, Katong. and then Vicar of Selangor.

From 1959 to 1961, Chiu was Home Secretary of the Australian Board of Missions and from then, until his elevation to the episcopate, held a similar post with the World Council of Churches as Secretary of Laymen.

Church of England titles
| Preceded by Cyril Kenneth Sansbury | Bishop of Singapore; 1966 – 1981 | Succeeded by Moses Tay Leng Kong |
