= Kenneth Sansbury =

The Right Reverend Kenneth Sansbury
- Bishop of Singapore
- Church: Church of England
- Diocese: Diocese of Singapore and Malaya
- In office: 1961 to 1966
- Predecessor: Henry Baines
- Successor: Chiu Ban It
- Other posts: Warden of St Augustine's College, Canterbury (1952–1961); Warden of Lincoln Theological College (1945–1952)

Orders
- Ordination: 1929
- Consecration: 1961

Personal details
- Born: Cyril Kenneth Sansbury; 21 January 1905
- Died: 25 August 1993 (aged 88)
- Denomination: Anglicanism

Cyril Kenneth Sansbury (21 January 1905 – 25 August 1993) was an Anglican bishop in the second half of the 20th century.

== Early life and education ==
Sansbury was educated at St Paul's School, London and Peterhouse, Cambridge.

== Ordained ministry ==
Sansbury trained for ordination at Westcott House, Cambridge and was ordained deacon in 1928 and priest in 1929. His first posts were curacies at Dulwich Common and Wimbledon.

From 1932 Sansbury worked as an SPG Missionary at Numazu, Japan serving in various churches of the Nippon Sei Ko Kai. in 1934 he was appointed Professor at the Central Theological College, Tokyo. In 1938 British Ambassador Sir Robert Craigie appointed Sansbury as Embassy Chaplain. Until the outbreak of hostilities in 1941 Sansbury also served as chaplain to the British congregation at St. Andrew's Church, Tokyo.

After repatriation to Canada he became a World War II chaplain in the RCAF then Warden of Lincoln Theological College until 1952. From 1952 to 1961 he held a similar post at St Augustine's College, Canterbury when he was ordained to the episcopate as Bishop of Singapore. Returning to London in 1966 he was an assistant bishop and General Secretary of the British Council of Churches until 1973. His last post was as priest in charge of St Mary in the Marsh, Norwich.

== Bibliography ==
- A History of St. Andrew's Church, Tokyo (English Congregation), 1879-1939 (1939)
- Japan—The Past and the Future (1946)
- Japan, The War and After Series, No. 3 (London: SPG, 1947)
- (contributor) The Office of a Bishop: Papers Read at a Conference of Friends of Reunion at Ridley Hall, Cambridge, 29th September-1st October 1953 (1954)
- The Church of England and the Anglican Communion (1956)
- Truth, Unity and Concord. Anglican Faith in an Ecumenical Setting (1967)
- Combating Racism: The British Churches and the WCC Programme to Combat Racism (1975)

Church of England titles
Preceded by Henry Wolfe Baines	Bishop of Singapore; 1961 – 1966	Succeeded by Joshua Chiu Ban It
