= Henry Baines (bishop) =

Anglican bishop (1905–1972)

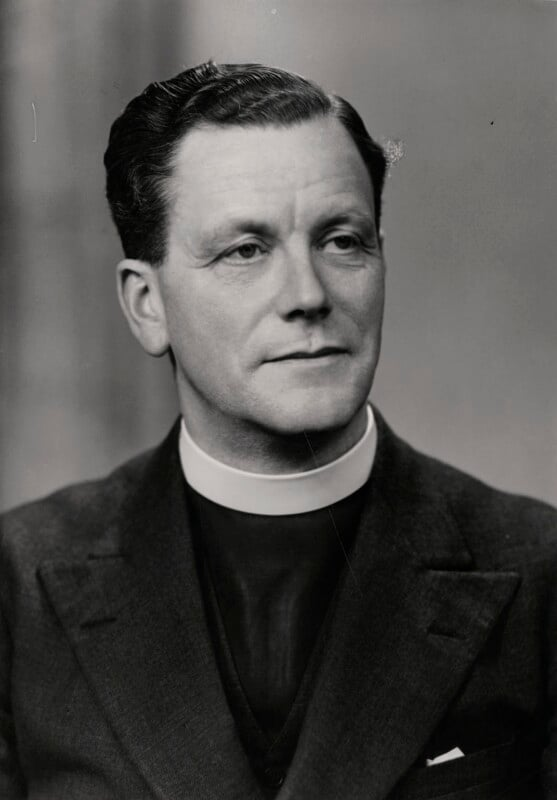
Baines in 1949

Henry Wolfe Baines (2 February 1905 – 29 November 1972) was an Anglican bishop.

== Early life ==
Baines was born in 1905 in Kingston, Surrey, the son of Talbot Baines and his wife Agnes (née Talbot). He was educated at St George's School, Windsor Castle, Repton School and Balliol College, Oxford. He was then a travelling secretary for the Student Christian Movement (1927–1929).

== Clerical career ==
After theological studies at Cuddesdon College he was ordained deacon in 1930 and priest in 1931, and began his ordained ministry as a curate at the University Church of St Mary the Virgin (1930–1934). From 1934 he was chaplain of St. John's Cathedral, Hong Kong, then Vicar of St Nicholas' Church, Radford, Coventry (1938–1941) and finally, before his ordination to the episcopate, the Rector of St Andrew's Church, Rugby (1941–1949) and Rural Dean of Rugby (1947–1949). In 1949 he became Bishop of Singapore. He was consecrated bishop on 29 June 1949, by Geoffrey Fisher, Archbishop of Canterbury, at St Paul's Cathedral (London, UK). In 1960 he was translated to be the Bishop of Wellington; he died in office.

Church of England titles
Preceded by John Leonard Wilson	Bishop of Singapore; 1949–1960	Succeeded by Cyril Kenneth Sansbury
Preceded by Reginald Herbert Owen	Bishop of Wellington; 1960–1972	Succeeded by Edward Kinsella Norman
