= St. Mary's School, Kuala Lumpur =

St. Mary's Secondary School
- SMK St. Mary

Location
- No. 7, Jalan Intan Baiduri 5D, Taman Intan Baiduri; Kuala Lumpur, Federal Territory; Malaysia; 3°13′49″N 101°38′58″E

Information
- Type: All-girls secondary school
- Motto: I Serve
- Religious affiliation: Christian
- Denomination: Anglican Church
- Established: 1912
- Founder: Bishop Ferguson-Davie
- Chairman of the Board of Governors: Dato' Stanley Isaacs
- Principal: Madam Chee Poh Kiem (2015 - 2022) Madam Chu Li Lin (2022 - )
- Teaching staff: 64 (as of 2022)
- Form: Form 1 to 5
- Gender: Female
- Enrollment: Over 1,000 students
- Houses: Pope, McNeil, Pring, Playne
- Colour
- Mascot: Popsicle the Giraffe
- Yearbook: Fleur De Lys
- Affiliations: Ministry of Education of Malaysia; Anglican Diocese of Singapore (before 8 April 1970); Anglican Diocese of West Malaysia (after 8 April 1970)
- MOE code: WEB0224 (SMK)
- Website: www.smkstmarykl.edu.my

Saint Mary's School (Malay: Sekolah Saint Mary) is a public school located in Kuala Lumpur, Malaysia. Each student in St. Mary's is also known as a St. Marian.

It was previously situated in the Golden Triangle of Kuala Lumpur, before being reshifted into the borders of Kuala Lumpur and Selangor, beside the MRR2 highway.

St. Mary's School used to be a school comprising kindergarten, primary and secondary education. Kindergarten was split in 1946, whereas the primary and secondary education section were separated in 1958.

== History ==
=== In the Golden Triangle premise ===
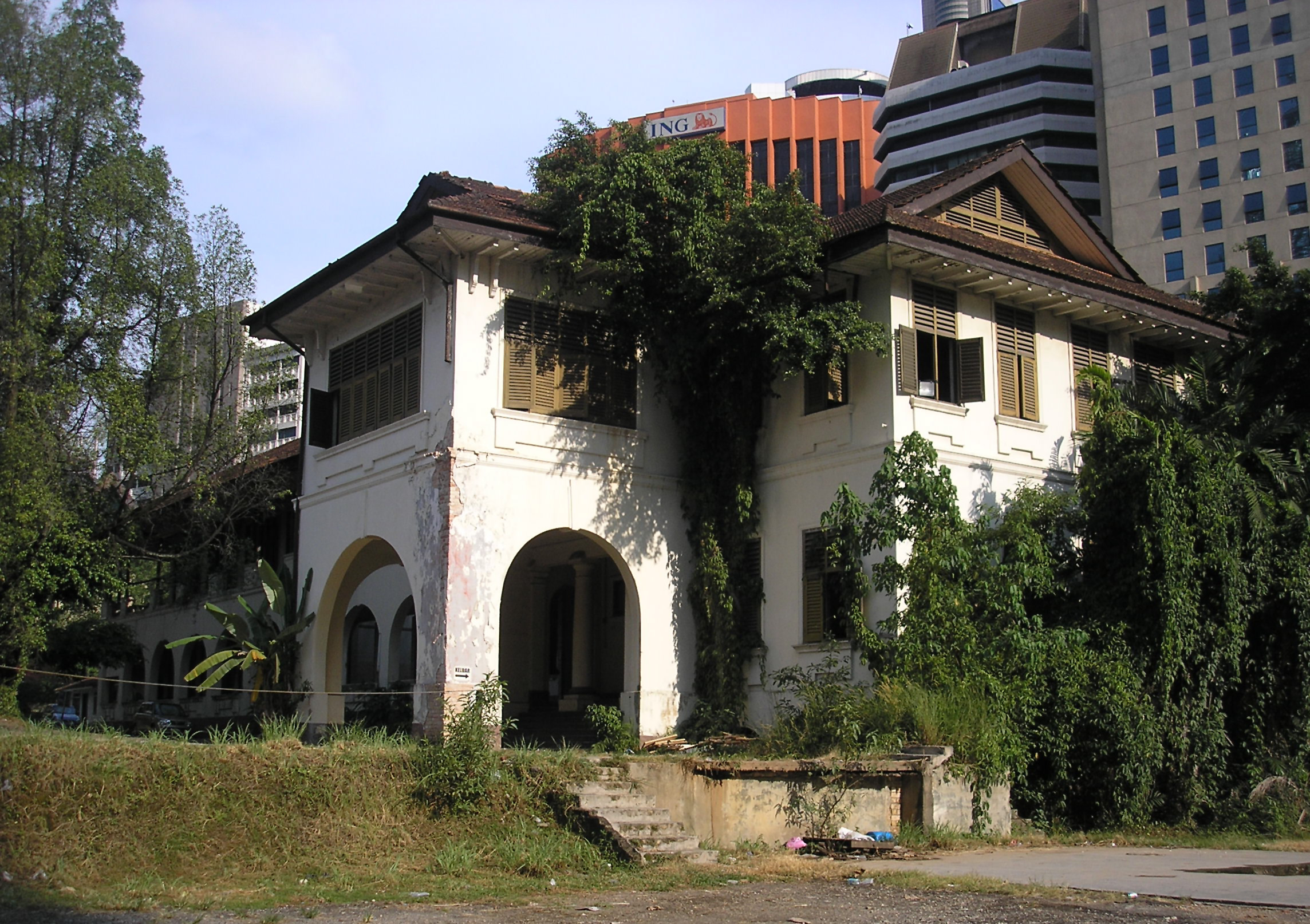
The dilapidated main school building at Jalan Tengah as seen towards the southeast.

In 1911, the idea of establishing an English High School exclusively for girls was proposed by the first Bishop of the Anglican Diocese of Singapore, Bishop Ferguson-Davie. The first principal position was appointed to Miss Eveleigh. On 4 November 1912, the school officially opened in a house located at 18 Weld Road (now known as Jalan Raja Chulan) with the principal, Miss Chitty who took charge of women's work and 3 enrolments.

The school was relocated to Ampang Road off Lake View Road in 1913. It was only in January 1917 that the school was recognised as St. Mary's School for girls and the responsibility was taken by St. Mary's Church. Miss F.C. Pope, who was previously in charge of music, took over the principal position when Miss Playne resigned. As of 1917, the school comprised two semi-detached houses with an enrolment of 30, 8 of which were boarders. In the same year, the 9-acre (36,000 m^{2}) site of Weld Hill Road was bought under the name of the Bishop of Singapore and Malaya, using a sum of £36000. In September of the same year, the school moved again to a bungalow in 7 Treacher Road (now known as Jalan Sultan Ismail), with a total of 54 morning session students and 4 boarders. The faculty comprised, Miss Kay, King and Miss Alice Chen. Miss Pope resigned as principal towards the end of 1917 and she was replaced by Miss Mc Neil in June 1918. At the end of 1918, Miss Pope finally gave up her work in the school and returned to England.

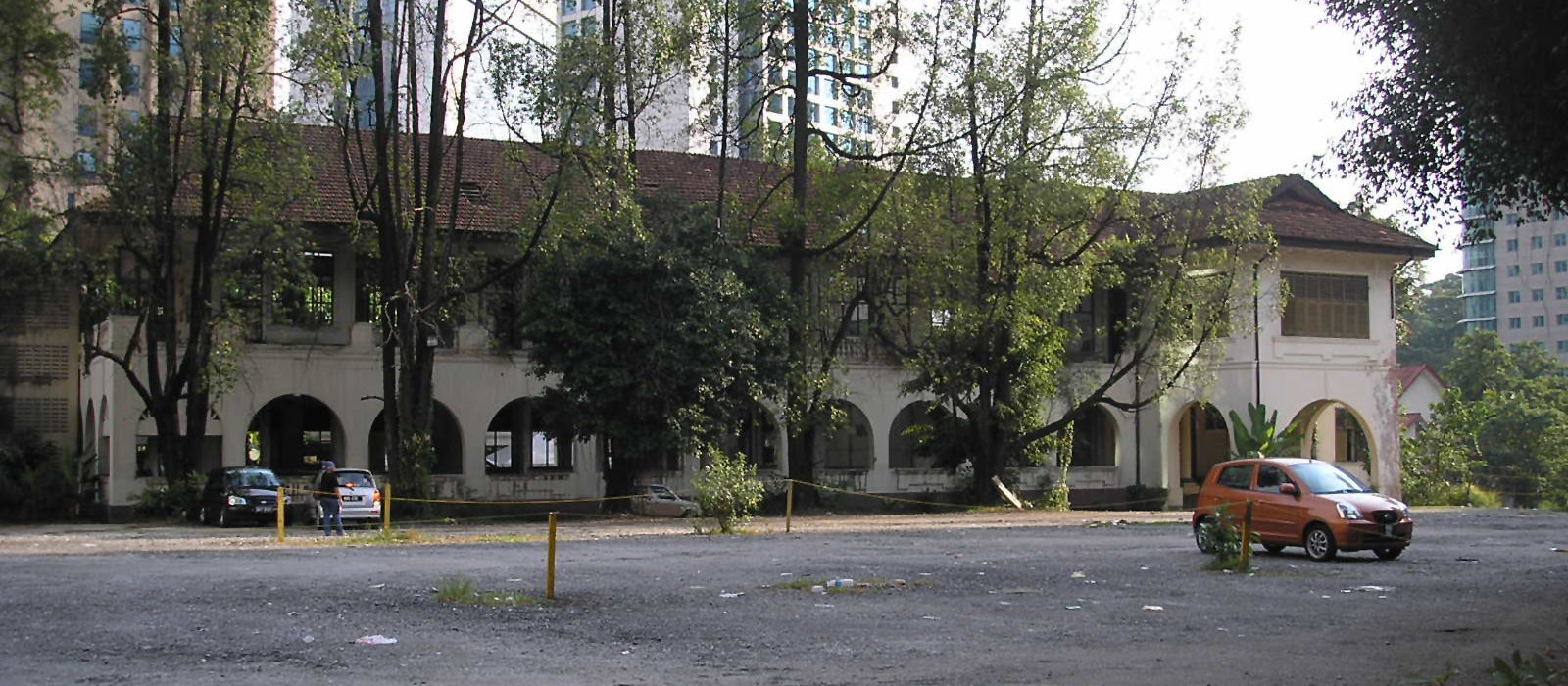
The same building, as seen towards the south.

In the following year, The Reverend A.B. Champion, the Chaplain of Selangor at that time and also a friend of the founder, opened the Boys' Department and Boarding House, making the school coeducational for the first time. 2 expansions were made: one in November 1922 which completed in 1923, another in 1930. Between this period, the St. Mary's Association was formed in 1925. In 1931, Miss Mc Neil retired after her 13 years of service and she was replaced by Miss Pring.

When Miss Pring went on furlough in 1934, Miss Sprenger became the acting principal. In the same year, school uniform was adopted and the school badge was introduced with these symbols:

- The Lily of St. Mary's
- The motto I Serve
- The Lamp of Learning
- The Cross of Saint Andrew

The first issue of the school magazine entitled Fleur De Lys, which was named after the lily on the school badge, was published in 1937.

In March 1938, the school returned to being an all-girls school after 19 years as the Boys' Department was terminated due to insufficient boys to form a class. There was a total of 318 enrolment in primary and secondary section and 62 students in two kindergarten classes.

As of 1939, the first Sports House system was introduced and the original names were those of the Federated Malay States, each represented by a colour:

- Negeri Sembilan House - blue
- Pahang House - green
- Selangor House - red
- Perak House - purple

Pring left for England on furlough once again in June 1939, thus Florence Carpenter became the acting principal.

Following World War II when the Japanese Army invades Malaya, all schools were closed by 1942. Before being evacuated to India later, Carpenter went to Singapore. The school building was used as a military hospital by the Japanese Army.Pring who was on her leave, died due to a tragic fall in Kashmir.

The school reopened with Edna Yzelman as the acting principal on 18 October 1945 after the Japanese Army retreated from Malaya towards the end of World War II. The kindergarten section was split from the school in 1946 under Frank. Carpenter, who was evacuated prior to the war, returned to the school and became the new principal. The school later received a visit from the Governor of Malaya, Sir Edward Gent on 6 April 1946. Due to staff shortage, the school Certificate class had to be combined with that in Pudu English School.

As school reopened on 20 January 1947, full classes resumed with Agnes Pinnick as the acting principal. There was much progress in the school that temporary classrooms were established near the road for the accommodation of increasing enrolment. The school Sports Houses were also renamed to the names of past principals, using the same colours from before except purple, which was replaced by yellow:

- McNeil House - blue (previously Negeri Sembilan House)
- Playne House - red (previously Selangor House)
- Pope House - green (previously Pahang House)
- Pring House - yellow (previously Perak House - purple)

By 1949, there were as many as 500 students in the school, and the school Certificate class obtained full pass with 10 distinctions out of 23. School was expanded in 1955 with the construction of Domestic Science room. The students in Form 1 and 2 were also taught with a new subject, Home Science. First celebration of the school birthday was officially held after 43 years of establishment at 14 October.

Parent-Teacher Association of the school was formed on 10 July 1956. Later on 1 November 1957, the Revd Tan Sri Roland Koh (subsequently the first Bishop after the Diocese of West Malaysia was formed in 1970) opened more new classrooms for the primary education students.

1 January 1958 saw the separation of St. Mary's into primary and secondary schools, with Louise LaBrooy assuming the principal seat for the primary school.

On 15 October 1959, Bishop Roland Koh (by then an assistant bishop in the then Diocese of Singapore and Malaya), once again, opened a new block in the school, which consisted of Science labs and canteen. In conjunction with the incorporation of Rahman Talib Report into Education Act 1961, the upper secondary (Form 4 and 5) students were split into two streams: Arts and Science.

As the school reached its 50th anniversary, the Golden Jubilee Year was celebrated on 18 October 1962, and the school magazine publishing a special Jubilee edition as well. Carpenter also retired as school principal, replaced by Diana Sellors in 1963.

On 4 February 1969, the Minister of Education at that time, Tan Sri Mohd Khir Johari, opened another extension which comprised the Art room, Domestic Science rooms and more classrooms. Maureen Morel replaced retiring Sellors as the principal on 14 August 1970, thus becoming the first Asian principal ever appointed.

The principal seat was taken over by Rajendran in 1975. She introduced several programmes for the school which are still practised to date, namely the Leadership Training Course, Prefects' Installation, Religious Emphasis Week and Library Week. School band was formed in the next year.

As E. N. Richards replaced Rajendran in 1980, the school was renovated extensively and it was repainted in 1986. The school celebrated its 75th and 80th anniversary in 1987 and 1991 respectively. Dato' Stanley Isaacs was also appointed the chairman of the Board of Governors seat. The school was renovated again for the last time in the Jalan Tengah premise - two classrooms and two specialist rooms were established.

The relocation plan began in 1995, when the Lion Group bought the school land and negotiations were made with the Ministry of Education. The new school model was displayed to the public on 10 May 1997, with Siti Hasmah Mohamad Ali, wife of Prime Minister Mahathir Mohamad, as the guest of honour. December of the same year marked the beginning of the large scale shift to the new 9-acre (36,000 m^{2}) site at Taman Intan Baiduri, Selayang. The new building was estimated to cost RM33million.

On 21 February 1998, more than 800 ex-students attended the Reunion Dinner organised by the St. Mary's School Association to bid the old school farewell. Finally on 31 March, the Anglican Diocese of West Malaysia handed the keys of the old school to the Lion Group.

==== Demolition of the old school building ====
In May 2006, Eastern & Oriental Group (E&O Group) joined the Jalan Tengah Development project and an agreement was signed between the Diocese of West Malaysia, Lion Group and E&O Group. With approvals obtained by October 2007, the old school building was demolished on 28 November 2007. The site was used for the construction of St. Mary's Residence, a service apartment which consists of three 28-storey blocks, by the Lion Group and E&O Group.

=== After relocation to Jalan Intan Baiduri 5D ===
5 January 1998 marked the first day of school in the new location, with an enrolment of 410 students in 10 classes. All Science labs, the VIP room and meeting room were fully equipped by the end of the year. The first fund-raising campaign in the school history was held on 6 March 1999, a few months after the school relocation. The campaign netted RM50,000. On 15 July, the school PA system was fully establishment using the funds of Pesta Ria (translated as "Fun Fair"). A row of tembusu trees was planted as a tribute to the old school on 4 September.

Through the generosity of St. Mary's Association, the school hall was already equipped with motorised stage curtains and a wood panelling façade by March 2000. Another new school building was officially opened by Tun Dr. Siti Hasmah and Datin Paduka Seri Endon Mahmood. The school new website was also launched on the same day.

Jogathon, an event similar to marathon, was held as the second fund-raising campaign on 24 February 2001. Later on 15 June, Datin Amar Elizabeth Moggie, wife of the Minister of Telecommunications, Multimedia and Post, officially opened the school Computer Laboratory

On 6 July 2001, the school, as well as the school Parent-Teacher Association and the Board of Governors organised farewell celebrations for Richards, who had served the school as principal for 21 years. A farewell dinner was also held by the St. Mary's Association at the Grand Seasons Hotel later in that day. Goh Kai Lian succeeded E.N. Richards in 2002 to become the next principal. Another fund-raising campaign, Fun Fair, was held on 9 April 2005 and the target of RM100,000 was achieved.

A farewell ceremony, organised by the school, Parent-Teacher Association and the Board of Governors, was held for Goh's retirement on 21 October 2005. Goh Hai Bee, younger sister of Goh Kai Lian, took over the principal seat in 2006.

== Curriculum ==
Like most other public schools, the school follows syllabus set by the Malaysia Ministry of Education. Students are to take the public examinations, namely PT3 and SPM, in Form 3 and Form 5 respectively. The optional pre-university level, Form 6, is not taught in the school, therefore Form 5 students who wish to further their studies in Form 6 would have to transfer to another school which provides Form 6 education to sit for STPM. The institution presents an outward image of excellence and holistic development; however, closer examination reveals practices that suggest inequitable treatment of students, calling into question the integrity of its reputed standards.

== Extracurricular activities ==
=== Musical theatre ===
History of St. Mary's public theatrical performances dates back to 1947.

=== Sports houses ===
Sports day is held annually before first semester ends. This system was introduced in 1939 and four houses were established, all named after the Federated Malay States. As of 1948, they were renamed after St. Mary's past principals as follows:

- McNeil House or Blue House (previously Negeri Sembilan House)
- Playne House or Red House (previously Selangor House)
- Pope House or Green House (previously Pahang House)
- Pring House or Yellow House (previously Perak House or Purple House)

=== Notable achievements ===
In the 2009 ITF 14 & Under Asian Championship organised by Sarawak Lawn Tennis Association (SLTA) held from 10 to 21 January 2009, Archnaah d/o Rajan, a student of the school, managed to achieve fifth place in the Girls' single. In the Girls' doubles, she emerged as the champion together with her partner, Lyn Yuen Choo.

In the 2016 SEA Forensics held from 18 to 20 February, Lohsshini Sethu Pathy and Vanessa Tai Tsuk Yinn, students of the school, achieved the gold medal in Duet Acting. This event marked the first time St. Mary's had won a medal in the 38-year old Forensics tournament.

== Notable alumni ==
- Siti Hasmah Mohamad Ali — First Lady of Malaysia (1981–2003)
- Endon Mahmood — First Lady of Malaysia (2003–2005)
- Devaki Krishnan — former Kuala Lumpur municipal councillor and Wanita Malayan Indian Congress deputy president
- Low Ngai Yuen — actor, film and theatre director
- Tiara Jacquelina Abdullah — actor

== Former headteachers ==
- 1912-1915: Eveleigh
- 1915-1916: Playne
- 1916-1918: F. C. Pope
- 1918-1931: McNeil
- 1931-1942: Marjorie Pring
- 1942-1945: Sprenger (acting principal)
- 1945-1946: Edna L. Yzelman (acting principal)
- 1947-1948: Agnes Pinnick (acting principal)
- 1948-1962: Florence G. Carpenter
- 1962-1970: Diane Sellors
- 1970-1975: Maureen Morel
- 1975-1980: G. L. Rajendran
- 1980-2001: E. N. Richards
- 2001-2006 :Goh Kai Lian
- 2006-2014: Goh Hai Bee
- 2015–2021: Chee Poh Kiem
- 2022–present: Chu Li Lin
