= Diocese of West Malaysia =

Diocese of the Anglican Church in Malaysia

The Anglican Diocese of West Malaysia

Location
- Ecclesiastical province: Church of the Province of South East Asia
- Archdeaconries: Upper North Archdeaconry; Lower North Archdeaconry; Upper Central Archdeaconry; Middle Central Archdeaconry; Lower Central Archdeaconry; Southern Archdeaconry; Eastern Archdeaconry
- Headquarters: Wisma Anglican, 16, Jalan Pudu Lama, Bukit Bintang, 50200 Kuala Lumpur

Statistics
- Parishes: 145
- Members: 36,628

Information
- Denomination: Anglican
- Cathedral: St. Mary's Cathedral, Kuala Lumpur

Current leadership
- Bishop: The Rt. Rev. Dr. Stephen Soe Chee Cheng
- Suffragans: The Rt. Rev. Dr. Jason Selvaraj (Area Bishop of Southern Peninsular); The Rt. Rev. Dr. Jacob Bau Chian Hui (Area Bishop of Northern Peninsular)

Website
- anglicanwestmalaysia.org.my

The Diocese of West Malaysia is an Anglican diocese which covers the entirety of West Malaysia. The Diocese of West Malaysia (DWM) was founded on 8 April 1970, as DWM together with Diocese of Singapore split from Diocese of Singapore and Malaya. As a result, the Diocese of Singapore and Malaya was dissolved.

== History ==
Anglicanism came to the Malay Peninsula following the establishment of the British East India Company's administered settlement on Penang island in 1786. The local magistrate, George Caunter, was appointed a Lay Clerk/Acting Chaplain to provide spiritual ministry to the settlers. Under his ministry the first entry into the church register was made in 1799.

The See of Calcutta provided episcopal supervision for the chaplaincy work on Penang island and the first Anglican Church building, the Church of St. George the Martyr, was built and consecrated by the Metropolitan, Thomas Fanshaw Middleton, in 1819.

The See of Calcutta extended from India to New Zealand and was thus practically unmanageable. As a result, in 1855, a Diocese of Singapore, Labuan and Sarawak was created by Letters Patent for the better administration of these outlying areas. The new diocese became a missionary diocese of the Archdiocese of Canterbury.

In 1867 the whole of Penang island came under direct British rule, precipitated by the foreclosure of the East India Company. Consequently, the chaplaincy of the Madras Presidency in Penang ceased. Meanwhile, a major shift in mission outlook took place with the Society for the Propagation of Gospel in Foreign Parts taking an active role in procuring ‘chaplains' for the Crown in its colonies. This led to a time of great missionary activity in the new Diocese and a period of Chinese and Indian immigration.

For better administration in-line with the political changes taking place in the region, the Diocese of Singapore, Labuan and Sarawak was further reorganised into the Diocese of Singapore in 1909 with the See located in Singapore. After 120 years, the Anglican church in South-East Asia was finally positioned to take responsibility for its own mission and growth.

Church life and ministry was drastically affected by World War II and the Japanese Occupation of the peninsula between 1941 and 1945; however, the diocese continued to thrive. Without expatriate clergy who had been interred, the work of the diocese fell on Asian shoulders, who operated with responsible independence.

The War and the loss of its expatriate leadership precipitated a sense of self-determination among the local Christian community, and an urgent need for training Asian leaders for this developing part of the Anglican Church. This need led quickly to the establishment of Trinity Theological College, Singapore.

Malaya gained independence from British rule in 1957. Following this, in 1960, the Diocese was renamed the Diocese of Singapore and Malaya to give due recognition to the political importance of Malaya. In 1963, Malaya became the Federation of Malaysia with the inclusion of Sabah and Sarawak under one central government.

Ten years after the creation of the Diocese of Singapore and Malaya, in 1971, a new and independent Diocese, the Diocese of West Malaysia, was incorporated by an Act of the Malaysian Parliament.

In 1996, the Church of the Province of South East Asia consisting of the dioceses of Sabah, Sarawak, Singapore and West Malaysia was created by the Archbishop of Canterbury, thus making the Anglican Church in the region self-governing, self-supporting, self-propagating and truly indigenous.

In 2015, a decision was made by the Diocesan Synod to further divide the diocese into three separate dioceses and in 2016, two area dioceses were created, the Area Diocese of the Northern Peninsula and the Area Diocese of the Southern Peninsula, in preparation and two suffragan bishops were licensed to oversee the area dioceses. Provisional approval of the Provincial Synod for the creation of the new dioceses by 2020 has since been obtained.

== Organisation ==
The diocese of West Malaysia is overseen by the Bishop of West Malaysia. The area dioceses of northern peninsular and southern peninsular were created in 2016, each overseen by a suffragan bishop. The diocese is further divided into seven archdeaconries.

Area diocese	Archdeaconry	States & Territories Covered	Archdeacon In-Charge
Northern Peninsula; Overseen by the Suffragan Bishop of Northern Peninsula	Upper North Archdeaconry	Perlis, Kedah and Penang	Ven Soong Hoe Pin
Northern Peninsula; Overseen by the Suffragan Bishop of Northern Peninsula	Lower North Archdeaconry	Perak	Ven John Kennady Samuel
Central and Eastern Peninsula; Overseen by the Diocesan Bishop of West Malaysia	Upper Central Archdeaconry	Kuala Lumpur	Ven Dr. Vijendra Daniel
Central and Eastern Peninsula; Overseen by the Diocesan Bishop of West Malaysia	Middle Central Archdeaconry	Selangor and Putrajaya	Ven Stephen Chan Mun Koon
Central and Eastern Peninsula; Overseen by the Diocesan Bishop of West Malaysia	Lower Central Archdeaconry	Negeri Sembilan and Malacca	Ven Matthew Chay
Central and Eastern Peninsula; Overseen by the Diocesan Bishop of West Malaysia	Eastern Archdeaconry	Kelantan, Terengganu and Pahang	Ven Jacob George John
Southern Peninsula; Overseen by the Suffragan Bishop of Southern Peninsula	Southern Archdeaconry	Johor	Ven Edward M. John

== Past Diocesan Bishops ==
Episcopal supervision of the parishes within the Diocese of West Malaysia can be traced back to the oversight of early Anglican chaplaincies in the Malay peninsula from the metropolitan Bishop of Calcutta since 1814.

Bishops of the Diocese of Calcutta (Also Metropolitan See of India and Ceylon from 1832)
From	Until	Bishop	Notes
1814	1823	Thomas Fenshaw Middleton	Supervision of all Anglican chaplaincies in the territories of the British East India Company
1823	1826	Reginald Heber	
1827	1828	John Thomas James	
1829	1832	John Matthias Turner	
1832	1858	Daniel Wilson	Also consecrated as the first Metropolitan Bishop of India and Ceylon
1859	1867	George Cotton	
1868	1876	Robert Milman	Anglican churches in the Straits Settlements reorganised as the Church of England in the Straits Settlements after the transfer of the Settlements to the British Crown in 1867. It remained under the supervision of the See of Calcutta until 1869
Bishops of the United Diocese of Singapore, Labuan and Sarawak
From	Until	Bishop	Notes
1869	1881	Walter Chambers	Also Bishop of Labuan and Sarawak since 1868. The Church of England in the Straits Settlements transferred to the Diocese in 1869.
1881	1909	George Frederick Hose	
Bishops of the Diocese of Singapore
From	Until	Bishop	Notes
1909	1927	Charles James Ferguson-Davie	The united diocese was separated to form the Diocese of Singapore and Diocese of Labuan and Sarawak
1927	1940	Basil Coleby Roberts	
1941	1949	John Leonard Wilson	
1949	1960	Henry Wolfe Baines	
Bishops of the Diocese of Malaya and Singapore
From	Until	Bishop	Notes
1960	1966	Cyril Kenneth Sansbury	The diocese was renamed the Diocese of Malaya Singapore
1967	1970	The Right Rev. Joshua Chiu Ban It	First local born clergyman to be elevated bishop
Bishops of the Diocese of West Malaysia
From	Until	Bishop	Notes
1970	1972	Roland Koh Peck Chiang	The diocese was separated into the Diocese of West Malaysia and the Diocese of Singapore
1972	1994	The Right Rev. John Gurubatham Savarimuthu	
1995	2006	Tan Sri Lim Cheng Ean	
2007	2020	The Rt Rev Datuk Ng Moon Hing	Also Archbishop of The Church of the Province of South East Asia (2016 - 2020)
2021	2026	Rt Rev Dr D Steven Abbarow	
2026	Present	The Right Rev. Dr. Stephen Soe Chee Cheng	

== Education ==
=== Affiliated Seminaries ===
Name	Location	Year Established	Notes
Seminari Theologi Malaysia	Seremban, Negeri Sembilan	1979 (1974)	Started as Kolej Theologi Malaysia which was a merger of the diocese's Saint Mark's Training Centre (1970) and the Evangelical Lutheran Church in Malaysia's Christian Training Centre (1969)
St. Paul's Theological College	Kuala Lumpur	2016	An affiliate of St Mellitus College of the Church of England's Diocese of London and Diocese of Chelmsford.

=== Diocesan Mission Schools ===
The Anglican Mission Schools’ Board overseas the diocesan mission schools and runs the Bishop Tan Sri Roland Koh Teaching Scholarship for Malaysian Anglicans from the Diocese of West Malaysia who desire to pursue a teaching career.

Name	Location	Type	Year Established
SMK Saint Gabriel	Kuala Lumpur	National Secondary School	1946
SMK Saint Mary	Kuala Lumpur	National Secondary School	1912
SMK Perempuan Pudu	Kuala Lumpur	National Secondary School	1914
SMK Tinggi Saint David	Malacca City, Malacca	National Secondary School	1912
Penang Free School	Georgetown, Penang	National Secondary School	1816
SMK Saint Mark	Butterworth, Penang	National Secondary School	1901 (1885 as Butterworth School)
SK Saint Gabriel	Kuala Lumpur	National Primary School	1912
SK Saint Mary	Kuala Lumpur	National Primary School	1946
SK Perempuan Pudu 1	Kuala Lumpur	National Primary School	1914
SK Yong Peng	Yong Peng, Johor	National Primary School	1951
SK Saint Aidan	Bahau, Negeri Sembilan	National Primary School	1958
SK Saint Mark	Butterworth, Penang	National Primary School	1901 (1885 as Butterworth School)
SK Saint Mark (M)	Perai, Penang	National Primary School	1931 (as St. Anne's English School)
SJK (C) Saint Michael and All Angels	Ipoh, Perak	National Primary School	1932
SK All Saints	Kamunting, Perak	National Primary School	1937 (1878 as the English School, Kamunting)

== Diocesan Anglican Care Homes and Centres ==
- Wellspring Retreat Center, Rawang
- St Nicholas Home, Penang
- Ray Of Hope, Ipoh
- St Mark’s Cozy Home, Sungai Buloh
- Beacon of Hope, Sri Manja Petaling Jaya
- St. Paul’s Day Training Center & Bethel Centre Early Intervention Programme
- Pushpa Nesam Children Home, Johor
- House of Delight (Community Centre), Ipoh
- Rumah Damai (Senior Citizen Home), Kuala Terengganu
- St Barnabas Home & Community Centre, Klang
- Rumah Shalom, Gopeng
