= Independence Square (Kuala Lumpur) =

City square in Malaysia

Coordinates: 3.147749°N 101.693497°E

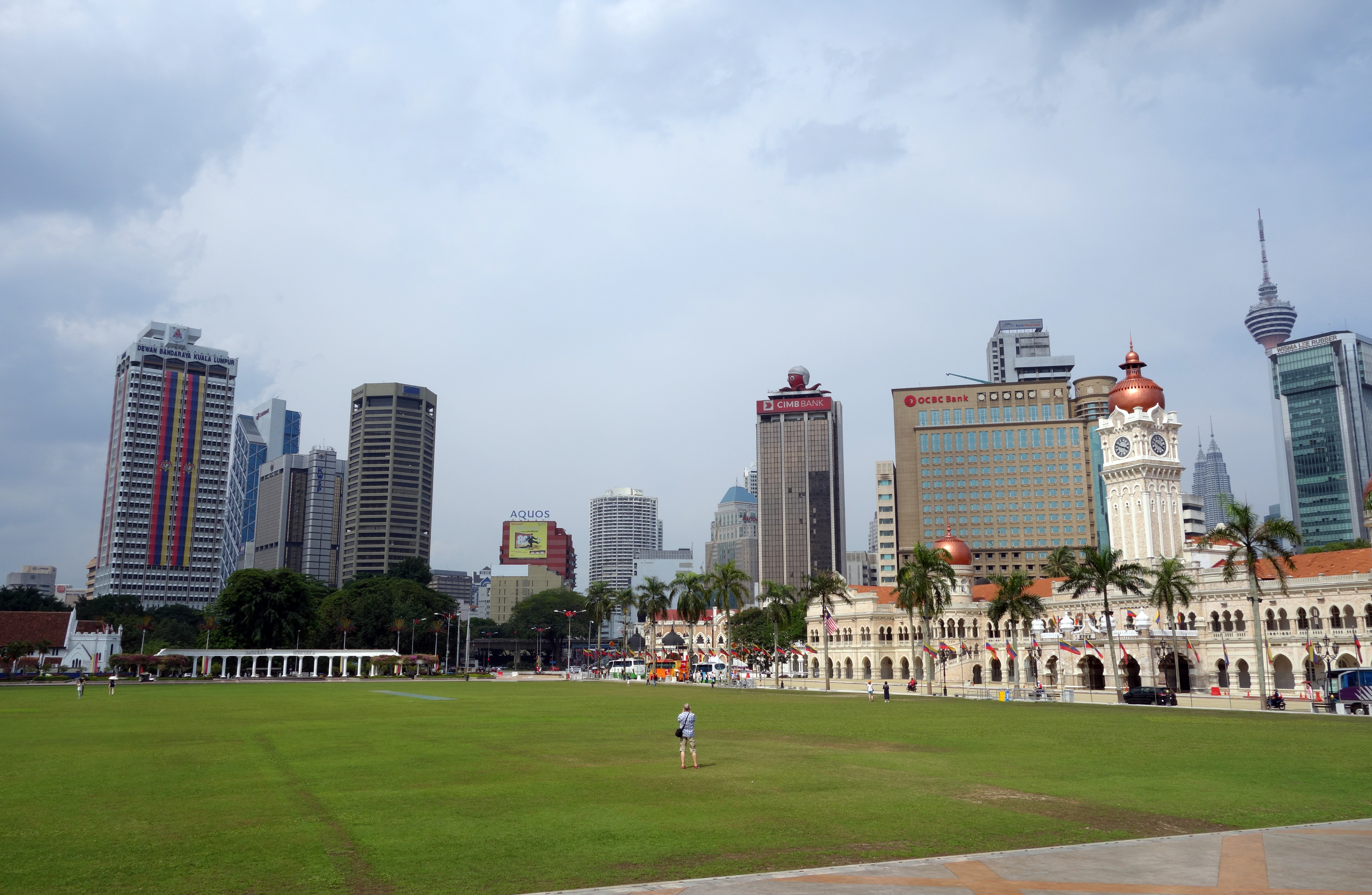
- View of Independence Square. The Sultan Abdul Samad Building, KL Tower and the Petronas Towers can be seen to the right side of the picture.
- Interactive map of Independence Square
- Maintained by: Kuala Lumpur City Hall
- Location: Kuala Lumpur
- Nearest Rapid KL station: Masjid Jamek LRT station

Other
- Known for: Sultan Abdul Samad Building; Selangor Club; Selangor F.C.

Independence Square (Malay: Dataran Merdeka) is a square located in Kuala Lumpur, Malaysia. It is situated in front of the Sultan Abdul Samad Building. It was formerly known as the Selangor Club Padang, or simply the Padang (meaning "field" in Malay), and was used as the cricket green of the Selangor Club (now the Royal Selangor Club). It was here that the Union Flag was lowered and the Malaysian flag hoisted for the first time at midnight on 31 August 1957. Since then, the Independence Square has been the usual venue for the annual Independence Day Parade.

== History ==
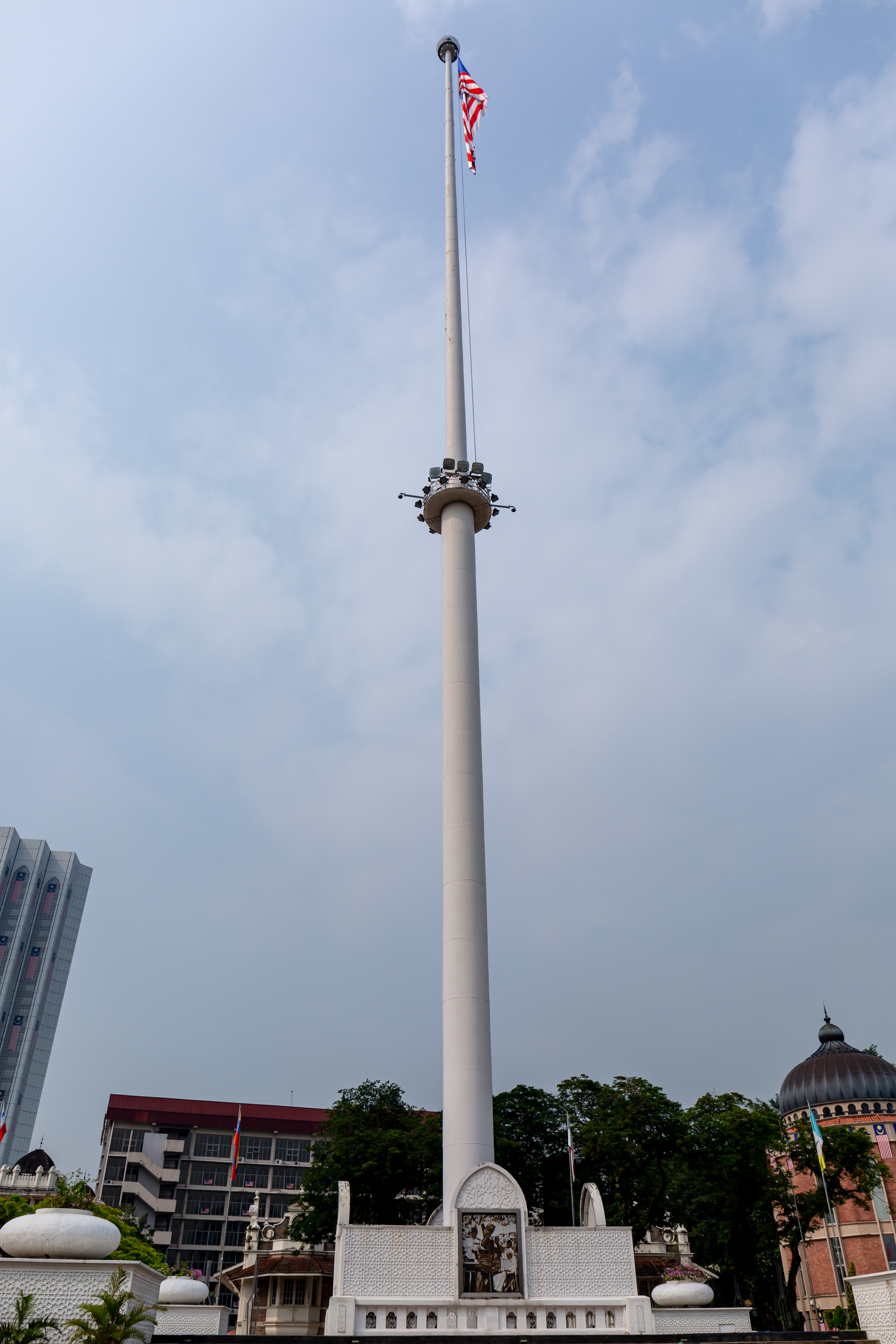
The flagpole in Independence Square

In the early days of Kuala Lumpur, the Chinese and Malay communities settled along the east bank of the Klang River. To the west of the river was land originally owned by Yap Ah Loy and was used to plant vegetables. In 1880, the state capital of Selangor was moved from Klang to Kuala Lumpur by the colonial administration. The then British Resident William Bloomfield Douglas decided that the government buildings and staff living quarters should be located to the west of the river to keep away from what he considered, as the unsanitary conditions of the town and the possibility of uprising from the locals. The government offices and a new police headquarter were built on Bukit Aman, with accommodation for the police located on Barrack Road (now Jalan Tangsi and part of Jalan Raja). A patch of swampy and uneven ground immediately to the west of the Klang River was then levelled and drained to be used as a training ground for the police. The land was acquired from Yap by the British Resident Frank Swettenham for $50 per acre in 1882. This patch of land, originally named the Parade Ground, would become the Padang. Ten years later in 1892, the Acting British Resident Ernest Birch who was a keen cricketer then started to smooth over the ground so that it may be used as a cricket ground and other sports. The Selangor Club clubhouse was built at the present location in 1890 and the St Mary's Church was built in 1895.

In 1897, the government offices were relocated from Bukit Aman to the Sultan Abdul Samad Building overlooking the Padang. The building is one of the most significant landmarks built by the British and was designed by A.C. Norman, R. A. J. Bidwell, and A. B. Hubback in an Indo-Saracenic or Neo-Mughal style of architecture. This building housed the Selangor State Secretariat and later the Supreme Court before the court was moved, and the building was left unused for a few years. It now houses the Ministry of Heritage, Culture and Arts.

As the Sultan Abdul Samad Building was designed and its construction began before Kuala Lumpur became the capital of the Federated Malay States, it became inadequate for the use of a burgeoning bureaucracy when it was made the capital. Many buildings were then constructed near to the building and also around the Padang. A printing office was constructed in 1899 on the southwest corner of the Padang, the town hall to the northeast in 1904, the FMS Railway offices to the southeast in 1905, the General Post Office south of the Sultan Abdul Samad Building in 1907, the Survey Department building in 1910 and the Supreme Court in 1915 in the northeast area.

On the midnight of 30 August 1957, the British flag was lowered and the Malayan flag was raised for the first time at the Padang, an event watched by a large number of people there. In the morning of 31 August 1957, the ceremony for Malayan independence was then held at the Merdeka Stadium.

As the Padang is located in front of the government offices, it is used for many national and civic events. The Padang was once leased to the Selangor Club which used it for various sports such as cricket and rugby. The turf in the Padang is often damaged due to such sporting events held here, causing the public to refrain from visiting the site. In 1987, the Padang was taken back by City Hall and in return, the Selangor Club was given a piece of land in Bukit Kiara. Conversely, the government turned the Padang into a historical park and tourist attraction, naming the site Dataran Merdeka, with elements inspired from Trafalgar Square in London. The focal point of the site was the flag pole where the British flag was lowered marking the end of the colonial era in Malaysia. A separate underground car park was also planned, but not part of the Dataran Merdeka proposal.

The site was completed in October 1989, in time for that year's CHOGM and officially opened by then-Prime Minister Mahathir Mohamad on 31 December 1989 along with the launch of the Visit Malaysia Year 1990 campaign which began on 1 January 1990.

On 31 August 2007, Prime Minister Abdullah Ahmad Badawi shouted 'Merdeka!' on midnight celebrations, where thousands of Malaysians celebrated 50 years of nationhood.

== Notable buildings and features ==
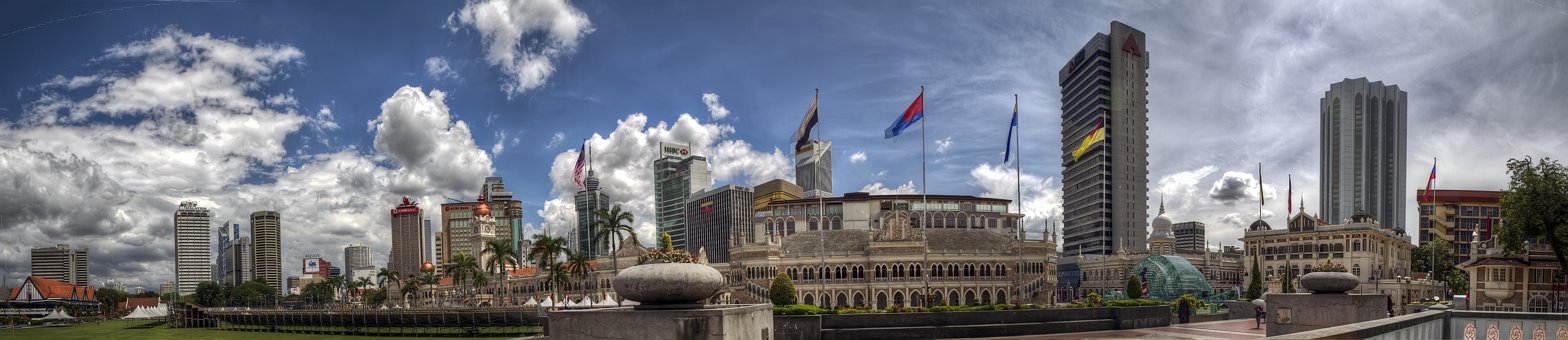
Panorama of buildings around the Independence Square

A 95-metre flagpole, one of the tallest in the world, is located at the southern end of the square. A flat, round black marble plaque marks the location where the Malayan flag was raised for the first time. Near the flagpole at the corner of the Padang is a fountain, the Cop's Fountain, built in 1897 as a memorial to Steve Harper, a popular police inspector. A car park and retail area, the Plaza Putra which was later renamed Plaza Dataran Merdeka, was built beneath the Independence Square; however, the location had been affected by flooding.

Surrounding the square are many buildings of historical interest. Just beside the square is the Sultan Abdul Samad Building currently the office of the Ministry of Information, Communication and Culture of Malaysia. Opposite the square is the Royal Selangor Club which was first founded in 1884 as a meeting place for high-ranking members of the British colonial society. To the South is the Standard Chartered Bank Building, home of the former National History Museum which used to house a vast collection of historical items. The collection has since been moved to Muzium Negara. Next to it is the Kuala Lumpur City Gallery which tells the story of Kuala Lumpur through miniature models and The Spectacular City Model Show. To the North is the St. Mary's Anglican Cathedral, currently the Diocese of West Malaysia and the see of the Bishop of West Malaysia. Not far from the square is also the original Kuala Lumpur Railway Station, which is still operational. However, the main hub has recently been moved to KL Sentral in 2001.

== Activities ==
Independence Square is the usual venue for the annual Independence Day Parade. It is frequently used as the location for political rallies as well as other events. Independence Square was the starting line of The Amazing Race Asia 1.

== Transportation ==
The square is within walking distance west of Masjid Jamek LRT Station.

== Gallery ==
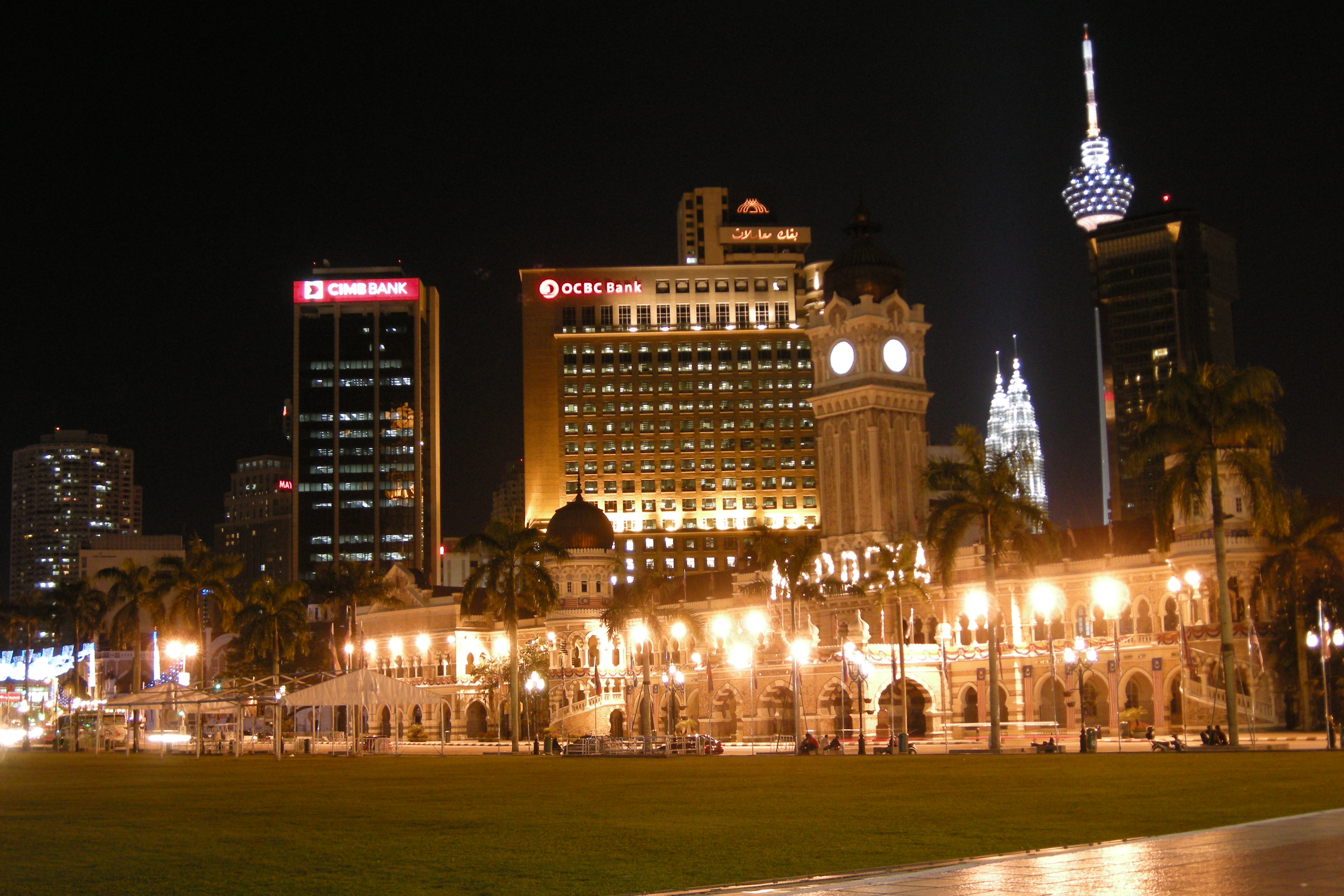
Independence Square at night

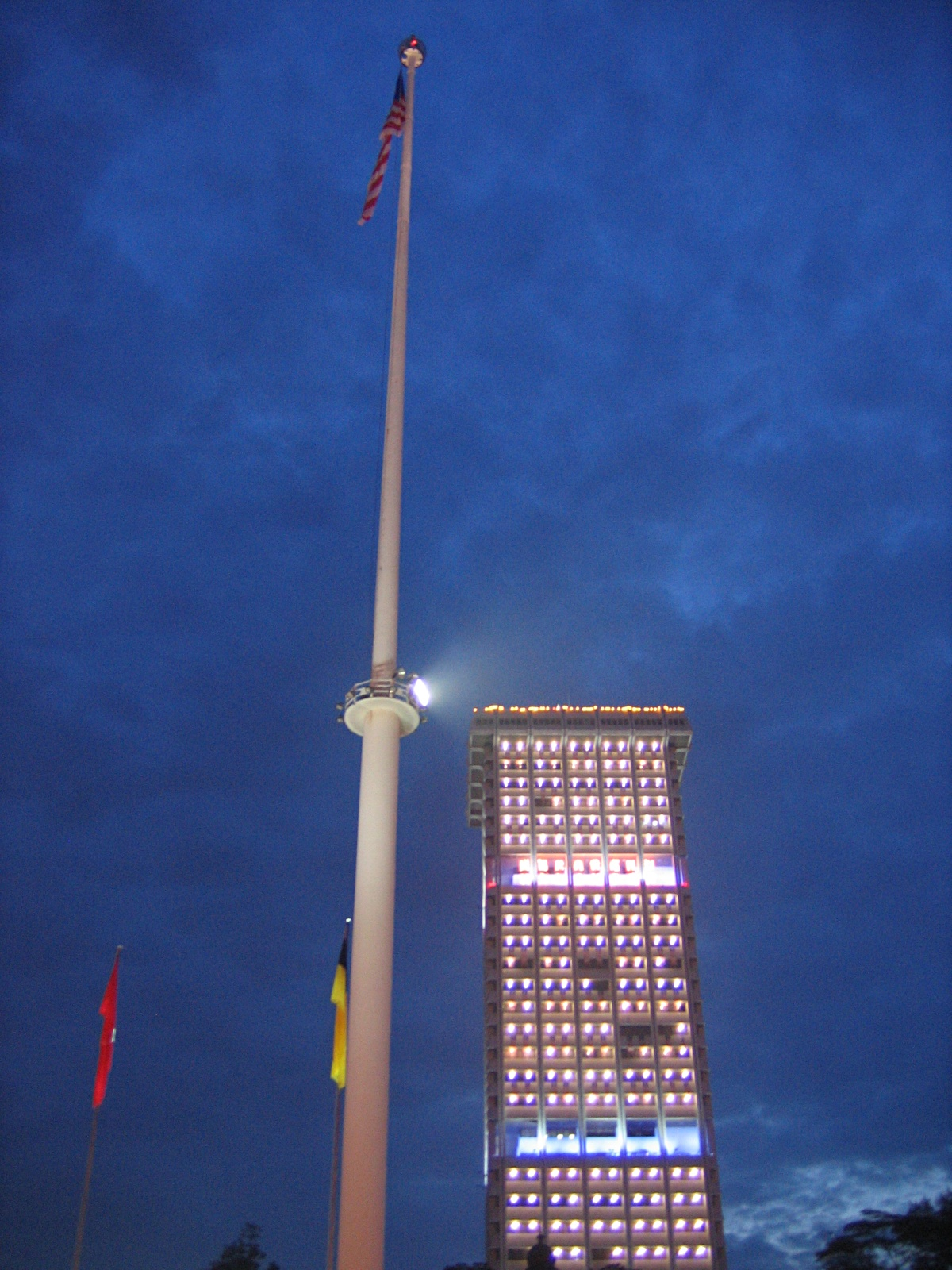
The flagpole at night

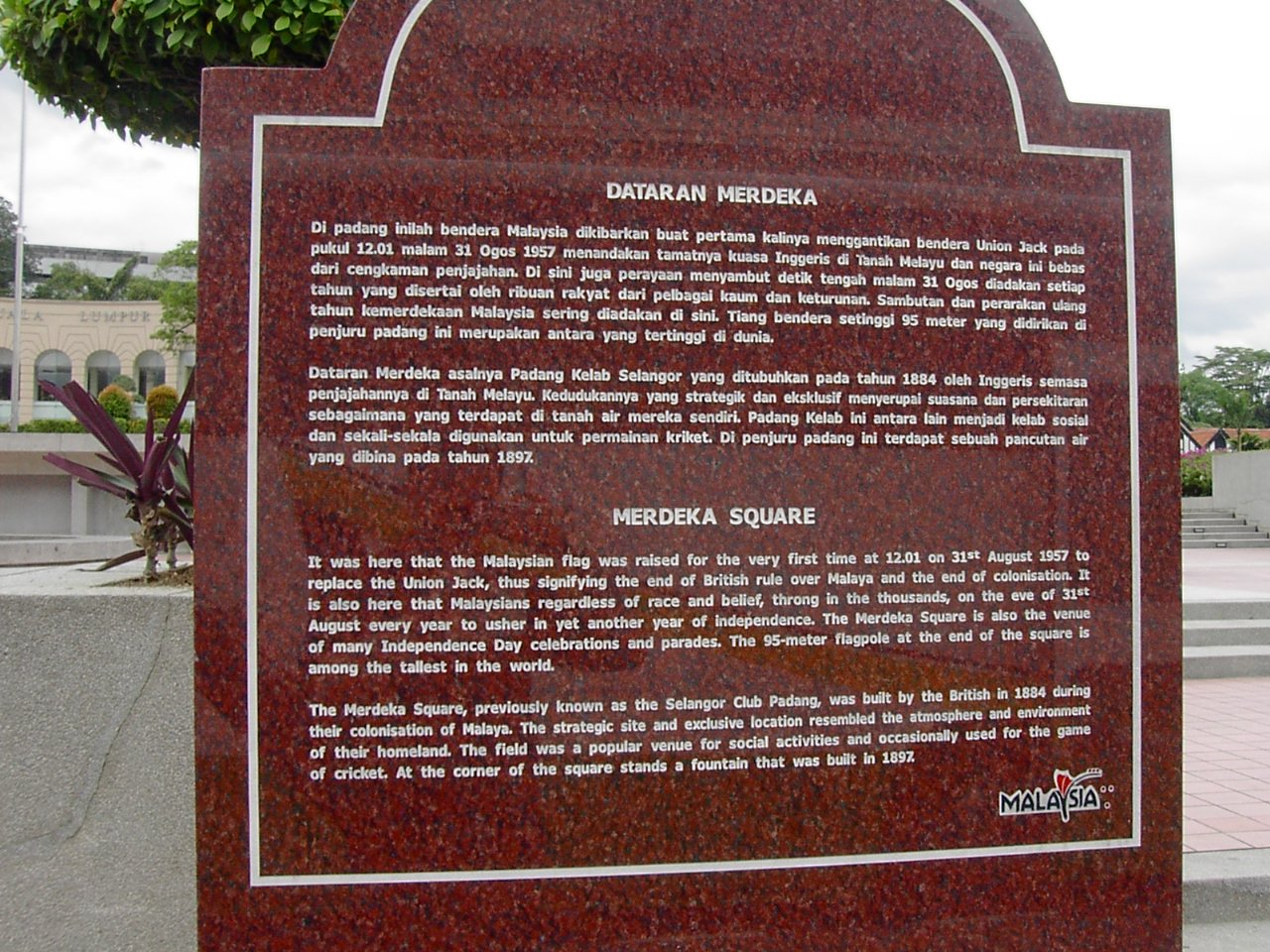
A plaque at the Independence Square

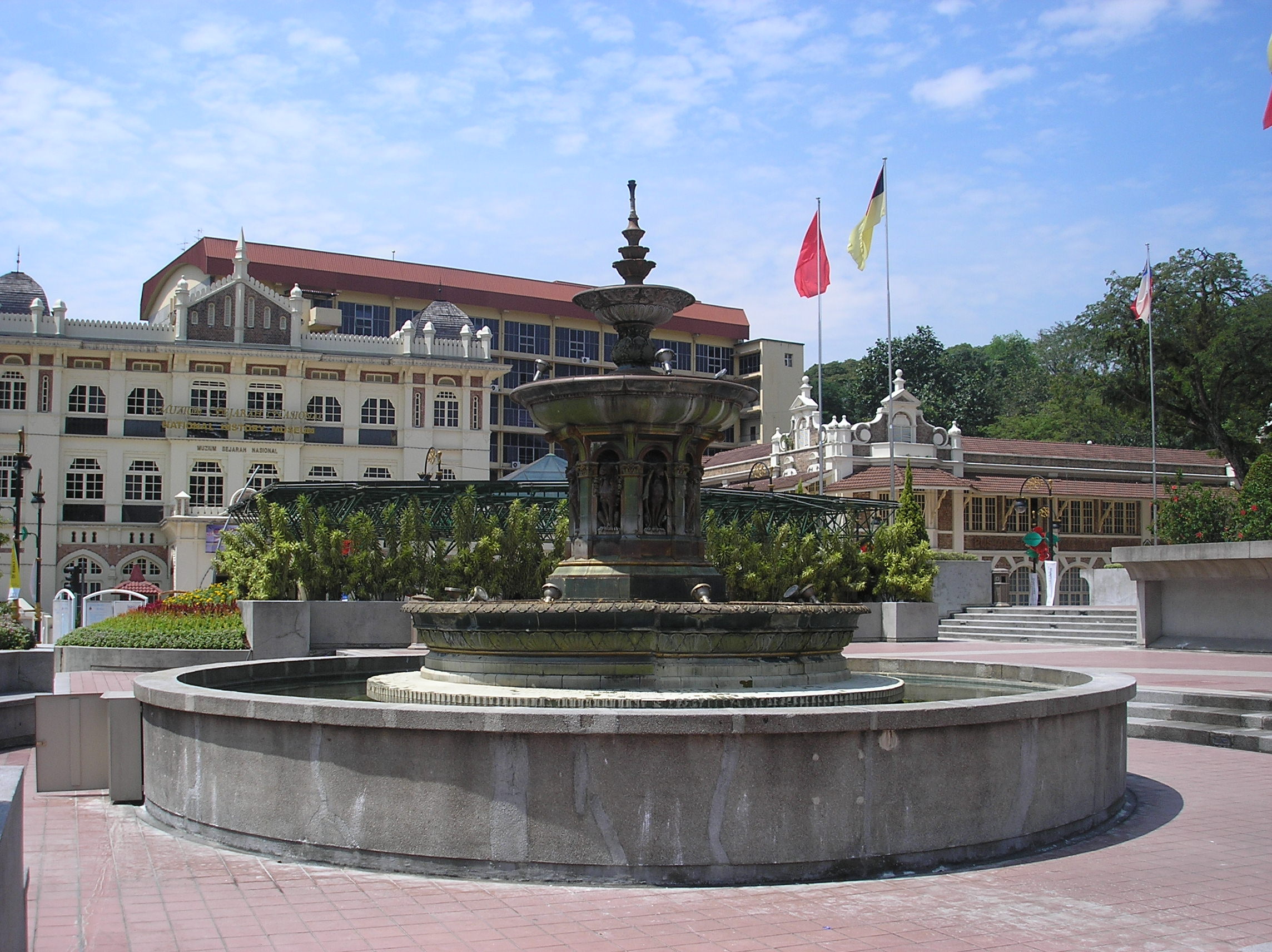
Cop's Fountain

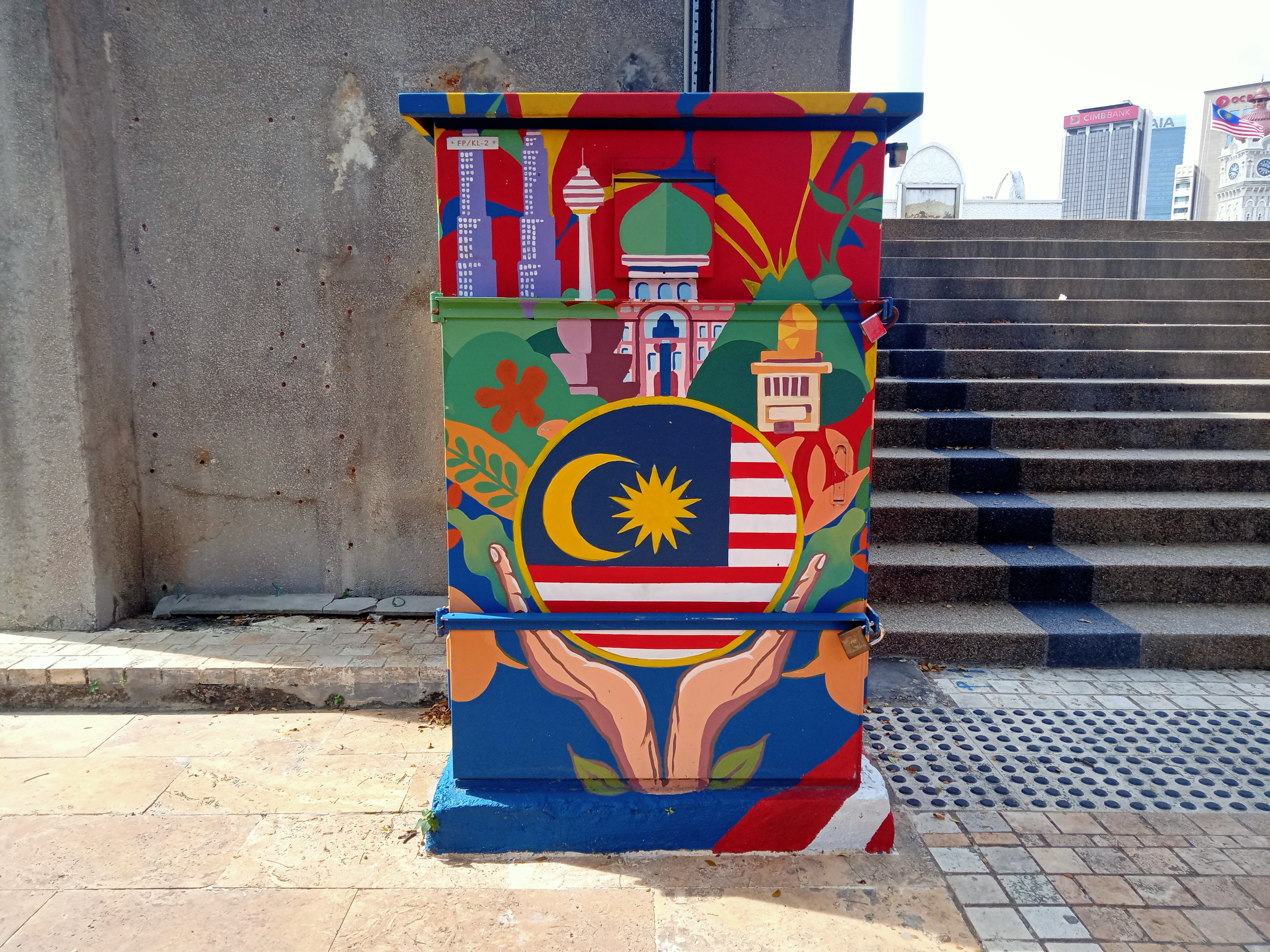
One of the utility box arts found near Independence Square.

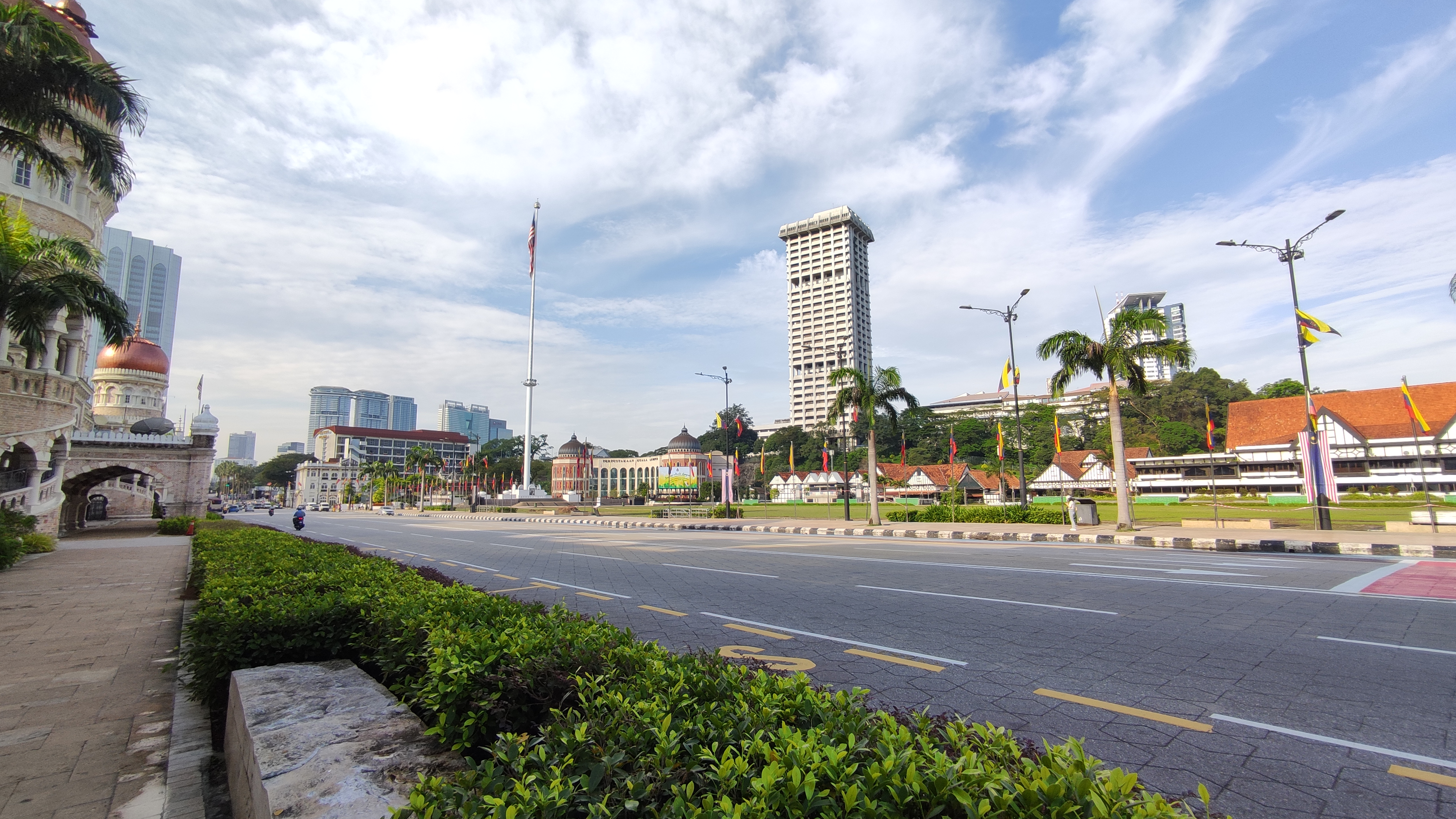
The road between Sultan Abdul Samad Building and Merdeka Square.

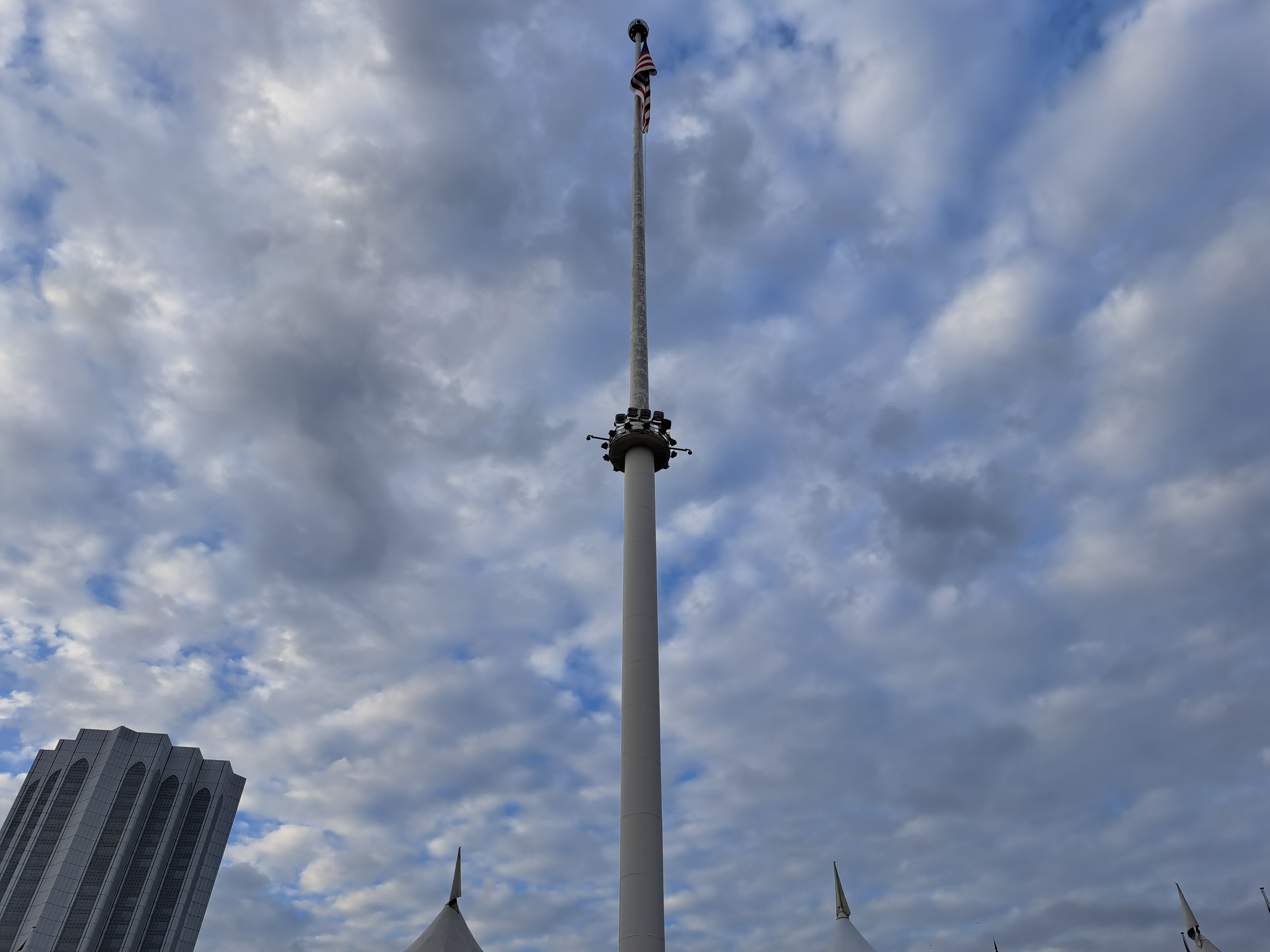
The flagpole at daytime.

== See also ==
- Merdeka Square, Jakarta
- Medan Pasar
- Occupy Dataran
- Putra Square
