= Roland Koh =

Anglican bishop in Malaysia

- Born: 1908 or 1909; Sandakan, British North Borneo
- Died: October 6, 1972 (aged 63); Philadelphia, Pennsylvania, United States
- Occupation: Clergyman in the Anglican Church

Chinese name
- Traditional Chinese: 許碧章
- Simplified Chinese: 许碧章
- Hanyu Pinyin: Xǔ Bìzhāng
- Hokkien POJ: Khó͘ Phek-chiang

Tan Sri Roland Koh Peck Chiang (c. 1909 – 6 October 1972) was a Malaysian clergyman in the Anglican Church. He was the second Bishop of Sabah from 1965 until 1970, and then the first Bishop of West Malaysia from 1970 until his death.

Koh was the son of Koh Kim Hin and Anne Tan-Koh. He was born into a Buddhist family in Sandakan in what was then British North Borneo (now the Malaysian state of Sabah). He became a Christian as a student.

Koh trained for ordination at the Union Theological College, Canton (now Guangzhou) and was ordained in 1941. He remained at the college as a lecturer, before taking a brief incumbency for a year in Kwangtung (now Guangdong). He was Vicar of St Mary's, Hong Kong from 1947 to 1954, and then Priest-in-Charge of St Mary's Chinese Church, Kuala Lumpur, from 1954 until he was raised to the episcopacy in 1958.

His first episcopal appointment was as an assistant bishop in the Diocese of Singapore. He was appointed as Bishop of Sabah in 1965, and translated to the newly created Diocese of West Malaysia in 1970.

He was President of the Council of Churches of Malaysia in 1962 and again in 1968 and 1969.

He died in 1972, of a stroke, while visiting the United States.
