= St. Mary's Cathedral, Kuala Lumpur =

Coordinates: 3°09′01″N 101°41′36″E

St. Mary's Cathedral
- Cathedral of St. Mary the Virgin
- Malay: Katedral St. Maria Perawan; Chinese: 圣马利亚座堂
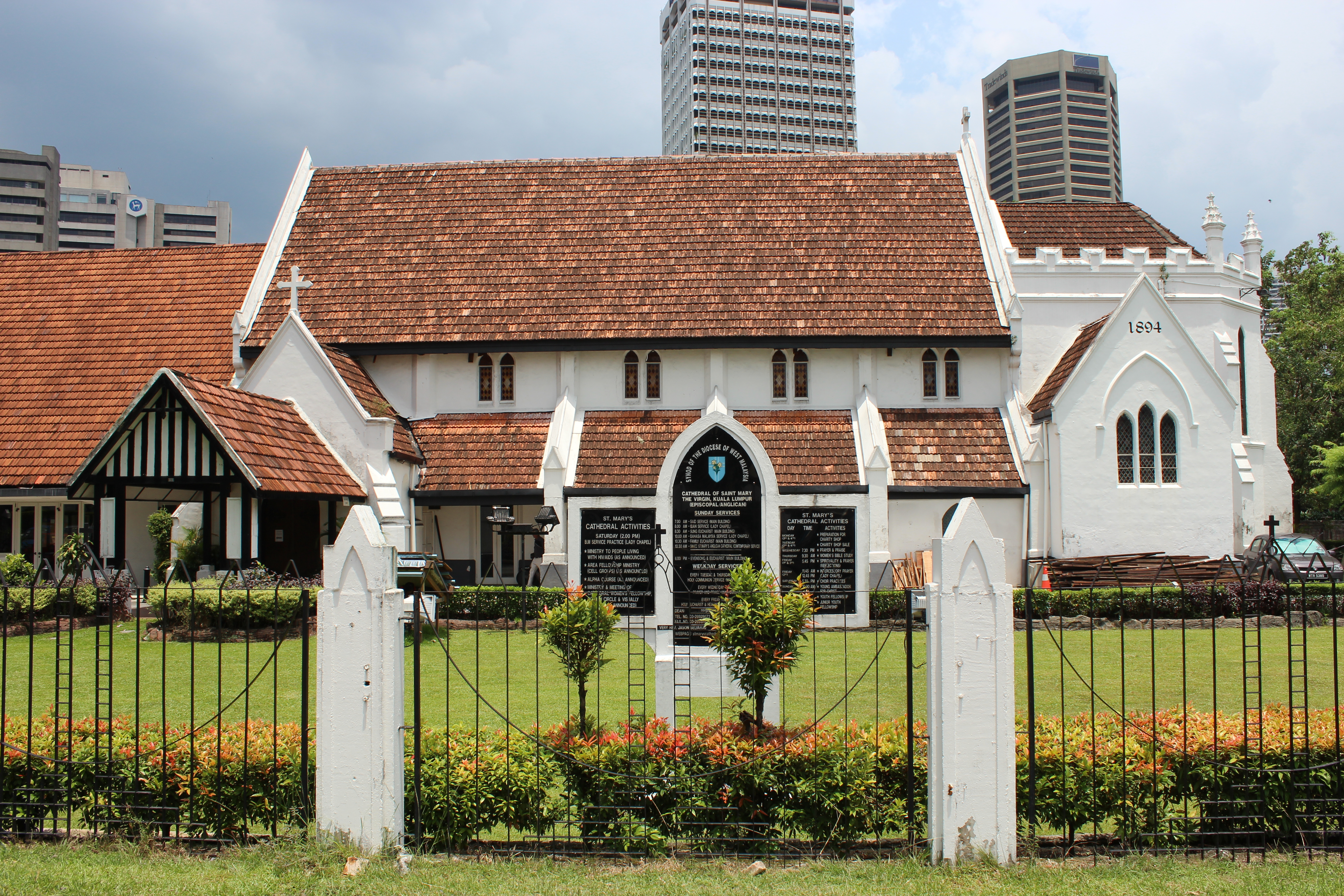
- St. Mary's Cathedral
- Location: Jalan Raja, Kuala Lumpur
- Country: Malaysia
- Denomination: Anglican
- Churchmanship: Evangelical Anglicanism
- Website: www.stmaryscathedral.org.my

History
- Founded: 1894

Architecture
- Functional status: Active
- Architect: A. C. A. Norman
- Architectural type: Early English Gothic

Administration
- Province: Province of South East Asia
- Diocese: Diocese of West Malaysia
- Archdeaconry: Upper Central Archdeaconry

Clergy
- Archbishop: Most Rev Titus Chung
- Bishop: Rt Rev Dr Stephen Soe
- Dean: Very Rev Dr Andrew Cheah

The Cathedral of St. Mary the Virgin or St. Mary's Cathedral is the cathedral of the Diocese of West Malaysia of the Anglican Church of the Province of South East Asia, located in Kuala Lumpur, Malaysia. It is the episcopal see of the Anglican Bishop of West Malaysia and the mother church of the diocese.

== History ==
The original church was consecrated to the Virgin Mary by the Right Reverend George Frederick Hose, the Bishop of Singapore, Labuan & Sarawak, on 13 February 1887. This structure was built of timber on Bluff Road, on top of a hill now known as Bukit Aman, where the headquarters of the Royal Malaysian Police is now located. It served as the centre for worship and spiritual life for the small group of Anglicans around Kuala Lumpur at that period. Notable parishioners of the church in that period include the British Residents of Selangor, W. H. Treacher and F. A. Swettenham (later Resident-General of the Federated Malay States and Governor of the Straits Settlements).

=== Relocation ===
In 1893, a decision was made to erect a new building to house the growing congregation, and a new site was found beside the Padang or Parade Ground (now known as Dataran Merdeka or Independence Square) of the Selangor Club. The amount raised by the congregation for the building of the new church was supplemented by a gift of five thousand Straits dollars from the government of Selangor on a suggestion by the Governor of the Straits Settlements, Sir Cecil Clementi Smith. Notable local contributors to the building fund included personalities like Yap Kwan Seng and K. Thamboosamy Pillay, even though they were not Christians themselves.

The foundation stone was laid on 3 February 1894 by the British Resident of Selangor, Sir W. H. Treacher, in a ceremony officiated over by Bishop G. F. Hose. On 9 February 1895, the 'first brick church erected in the native States of Malay Peninsula' was consecrated by the same Bishop.

When the Diocese of West Malaysia was established in 1970, St. Mary's Church was made the see of the Bishop of West Malaysia.

== Architecture ==
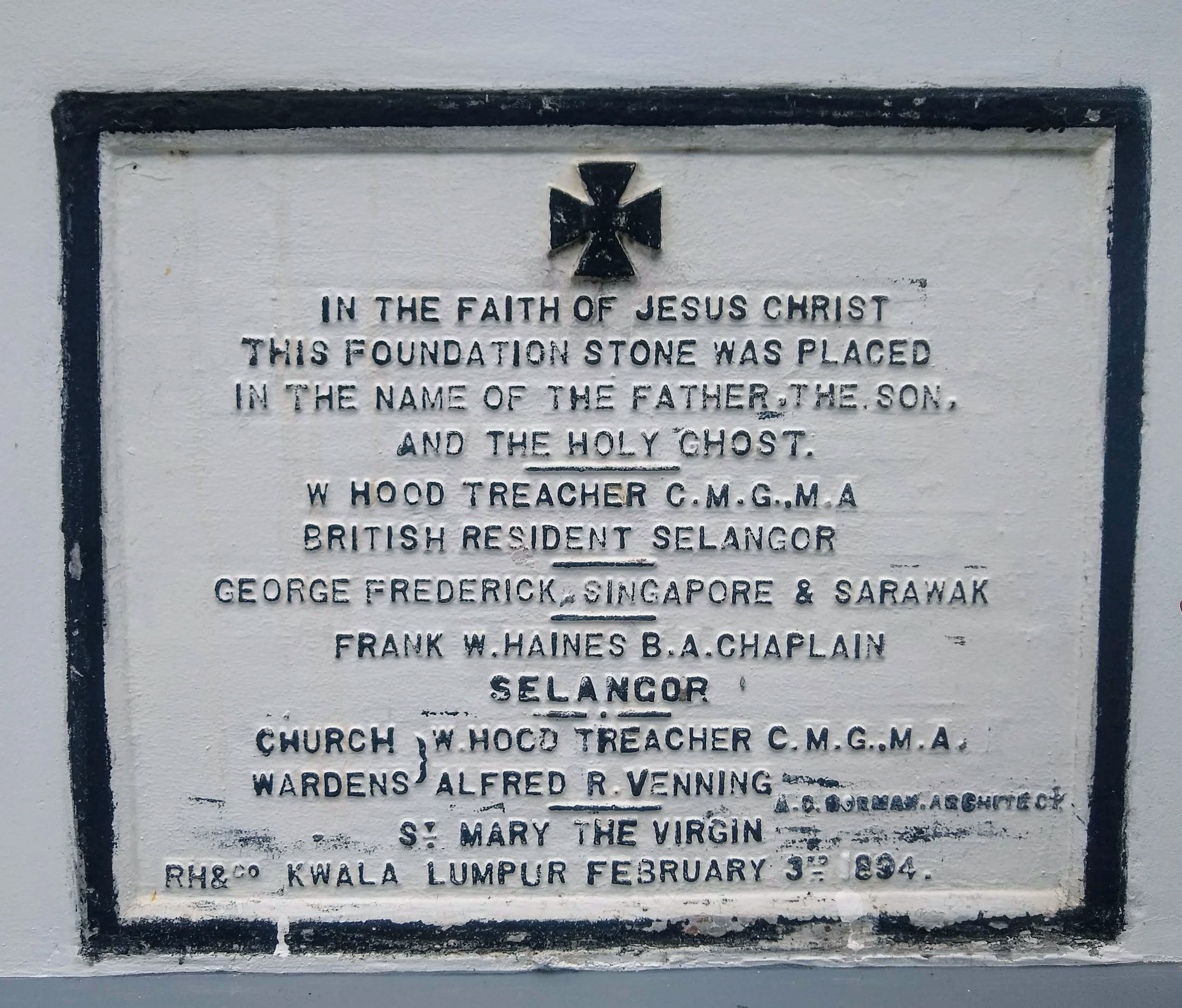
Foundation stone laying plaque.

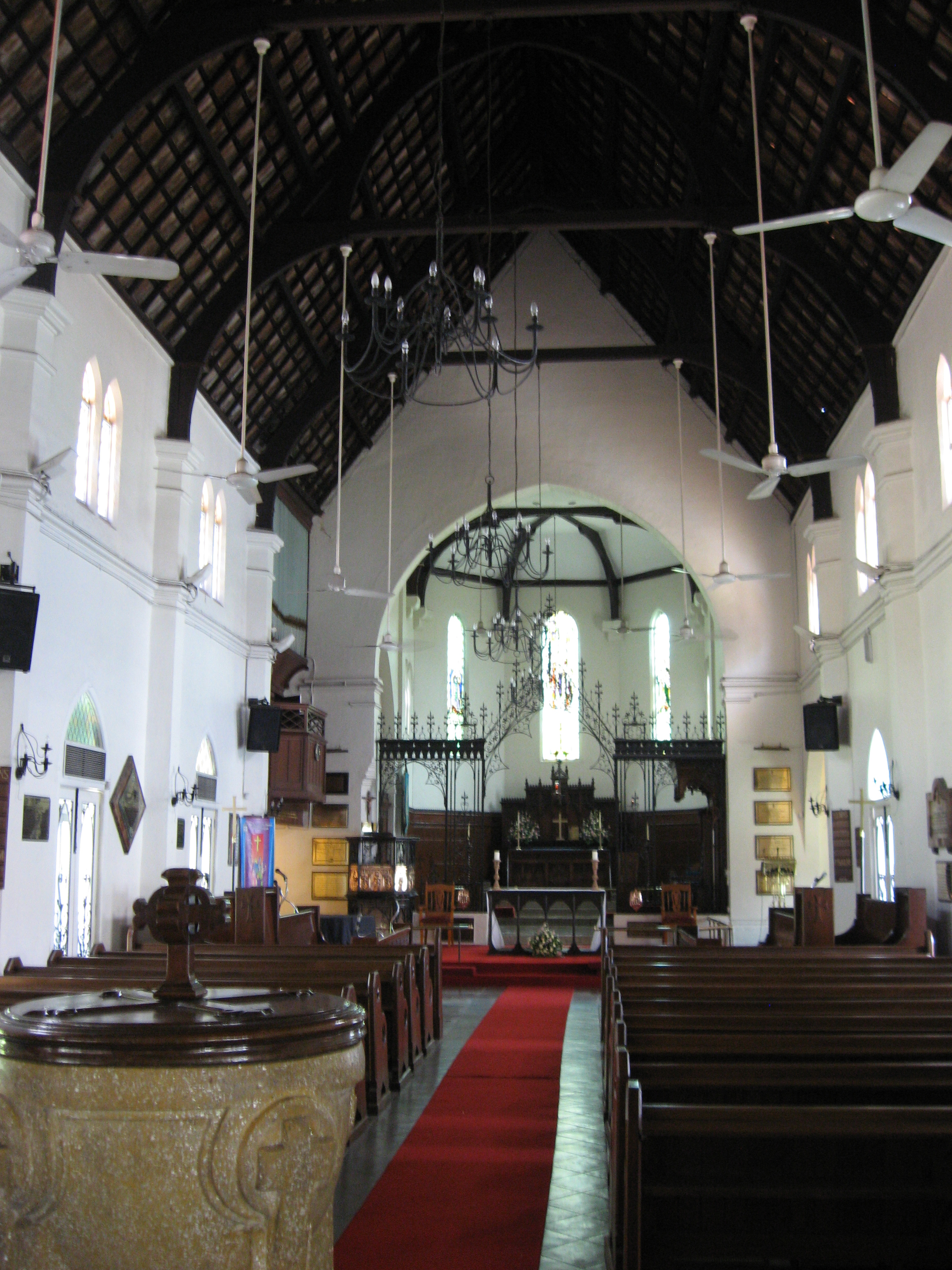
Interior of the Cathedral.

The church management committee originally held a competition for the design for the new church. Unfortunately none of the designs submitted was considered good enough, and it finally fell to the Government architect, A. C. A. Norman, to propose a design based on Early English Gothic architecture. This design won general approval.

The building consists of a nave 87 feet long by 28 feet wide, and a chancel 29 feet long by 22 feet wide with an octagonal end, together with a vestry and organ chamber. The nave can accommodate a congregation of 180 people and the chancel, a choir of 20.

In 1958, the back of the main sanctuary was extended to accommodate a hall called the Jubilee hall. Further redevelopment of the cathedral has resulted in the Multi-Purpose Hall, as well as additional offices for the clergy and a studio apartment.

== Organ ==
The pipe organ installed in the church is a secondhand unit built in 1898 by Henry Willis, the famous English organ maker who also made the organ for St Paul's Cathedral in London and the original Grand Organ of the Royal Albert Hall. The organ was originally purchased by Frederic Duberly, the Federal Commissioner of Lands & Mines and the Acting Resident of Pahang for his personal use in 1898 at the cost £381/12s,/8d. Duberly died of a heart attack on 3 April 1903, and his organ was packed up and shipped to Kuala Lumpur. In 1904, the organ was installed in St. Mary's and dedicated on 7 August 1904 but dismantled shortly after as the ownership of the organ had not passed to the church. It was only in 1915 when the church finally paid Duberly's executors the sum of $2,000 was the organ was finally installed in the north side of the church until 1926.

In 1925 and 1926, the organ was badly damaged by two floods. It was repaired by an R. Myram and moved to its present position in the loft above the floor level. In 1927, Kuala Lumpur's sole organ builder, James A Riddell, rebuilt the organ and replaced most of the wooden pipes, the pedal board, the wind chest, and some of the keys. It was badly damaged again during the Second World War necessitating a complete rebuild in 1951, making the organ more Riddell than Willis by then. The fact that Riddell's work was reminiscent of Willis' work strongly suggests that Riddell might have been a former apprentice or journeyman of Henry Willis & Sons.

== Sunday Services ==
=== English traditional/liturgical Sunday Services ===
There are currently 3 traditional/liturgical services in English on Sundays. The 7 am service is a said Eucharist. The 9 am is a sung Eucharist, with choir. The 11 am service is a said family Eucharist, with also choir. A crèche and Kids' church programme run at the same time as the 11 am service. These services are all held at the Main Cathedral building and are aided by a pipe organ. Reformed expository preaching is the norm in these services. The services vary in tradition, ranging from the 9 am high church style service to the more simple 7 am service, however none of the services are Anglo-Catholic in theology or ritual.

=== Contemporary Sunday Services (SMACC) ===
SMACC stands for "St. Mary's Anglican Cathedral Contemporary". There are currently three SMACC services, with two held on Sunday mornings and one in the evening. SMACC Wisma, the newest service launched in November 2024, meets at 9:00 AM offsite at Wisma Anglican (Jalan Pudu Lama). SMACC 1 meets at 11:00 AM on Sunday mornings, alongside a crèche and Kids' Church programme. SMACC 2 gathers at 5:00 PM, with a congregation primarily made up of young working adults and university students, though everyone is warmly welcome. SMACC 1 and SMACC 2 congregations currently meet in the Multipurpose Hall beside the main Cathedral and can be accessed through the back entrance of the Cathedral. Reformed expository preaching is the norm in these services.

=== Iban Service ===
The Iban congregation is made up mainly of ethnic Iban emigrants from Sarawak. The service starts at 8 am on Sunday mornings at the Multi-Purpose Hall. There is an Iban Sunday School that meets simultaneously at the nearby meeting room.

=== Bahasa Malaysia Service ===
The Bahasa Malaysia services start at 11 am and 3 pm on Sundays in the Lady Chapel of the Cathedral. Most of the members come from Sabah and Sarawak.

== Transportation ==
The church is accessible within walking distance north west of Masjid Jamek LRT Station.

== See also ==
- Church of the Province of South East Asia
