= Kuala Lumpur City Gallery =

Gallery in Kuala Lumpur, Malaysia

Coordinates: 3°08′50″N 101°41′36″E

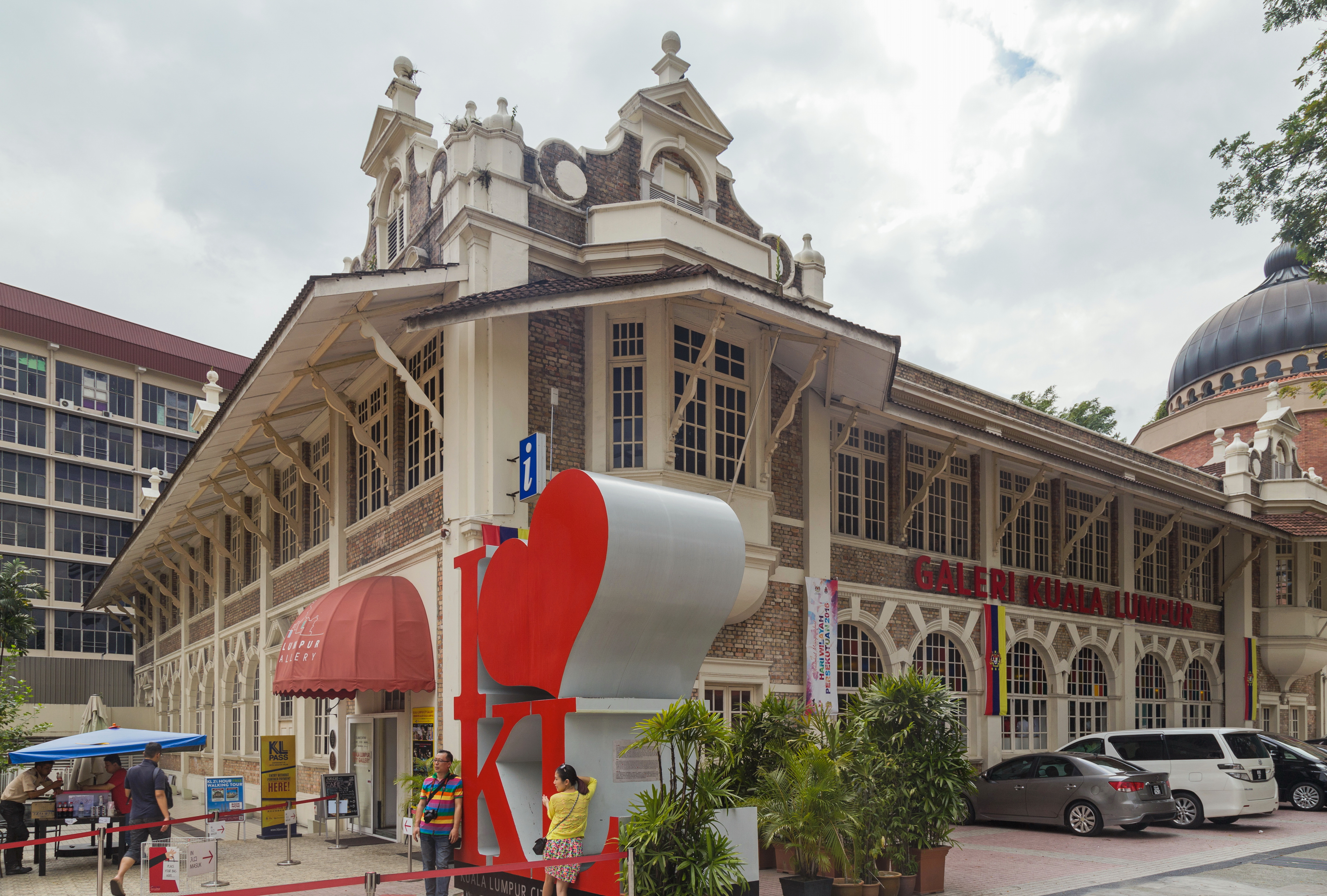
- Interactive map of the Kuala Lumpur City Gallery area

General information
- Location: Jalan Raja, Merdeka Square, Kuala Lumpur, Malaysia

Kuala Lumpur City Gallery is located on Jalan Raja, Merdeka Square, Kuala Lumpur, Malaysia, and holds a permanent exhibition focusing on the history of the city.

== History of the building ==
The KL City Gallery building, completed in 1898 and designed by A. C. Norman, government architect of the Federated Malay States, was originally constructed to house the British administration's printing office. It was responsible for printing all government official publications for the FMS, and those of FMS Railways.

Prior to 1890, the printing for the state of Selangor was carried out by the Singapore and Straits Printing Office in Singapore. In March 1890 John Russell arrived from England to create a printing office for Selangor, first establishing an office in Bluff Road on the hill overlooking the padang, before moving into the existing building on Jalan Raja in 1898.

== KL City Gallery ==
KL City Gallery was founded in 1989 after the building saw various changes in purpose and occupier after it ceased to be used as a printing office. Tenants included the Ministry of Labour and the Postal Authorities. The building consists of two floors of exhibition space, a cafe, a museum shop, and acts as a tourist information centre.

On the ground floor is a permanent exhibition called "Memories of Kuala Lumpur" which includes old photographs and maps on the history of Kuala Lumpur from its founding to independence. It also shares the space with temporary exhibitions.

On the first floor a large model of Kuala Lumpur which describes the history of the development of the city through a light and sound presentation. It is housed in a darkened room with viewers only permitted entry at the start of the show.
