= Standard Chartered Bank Building, Kuala Lumpur =

Early 20th century building in Kuala Lumpur, Malaysia

Coordinates: 3°08′51″N 101°41′15″E

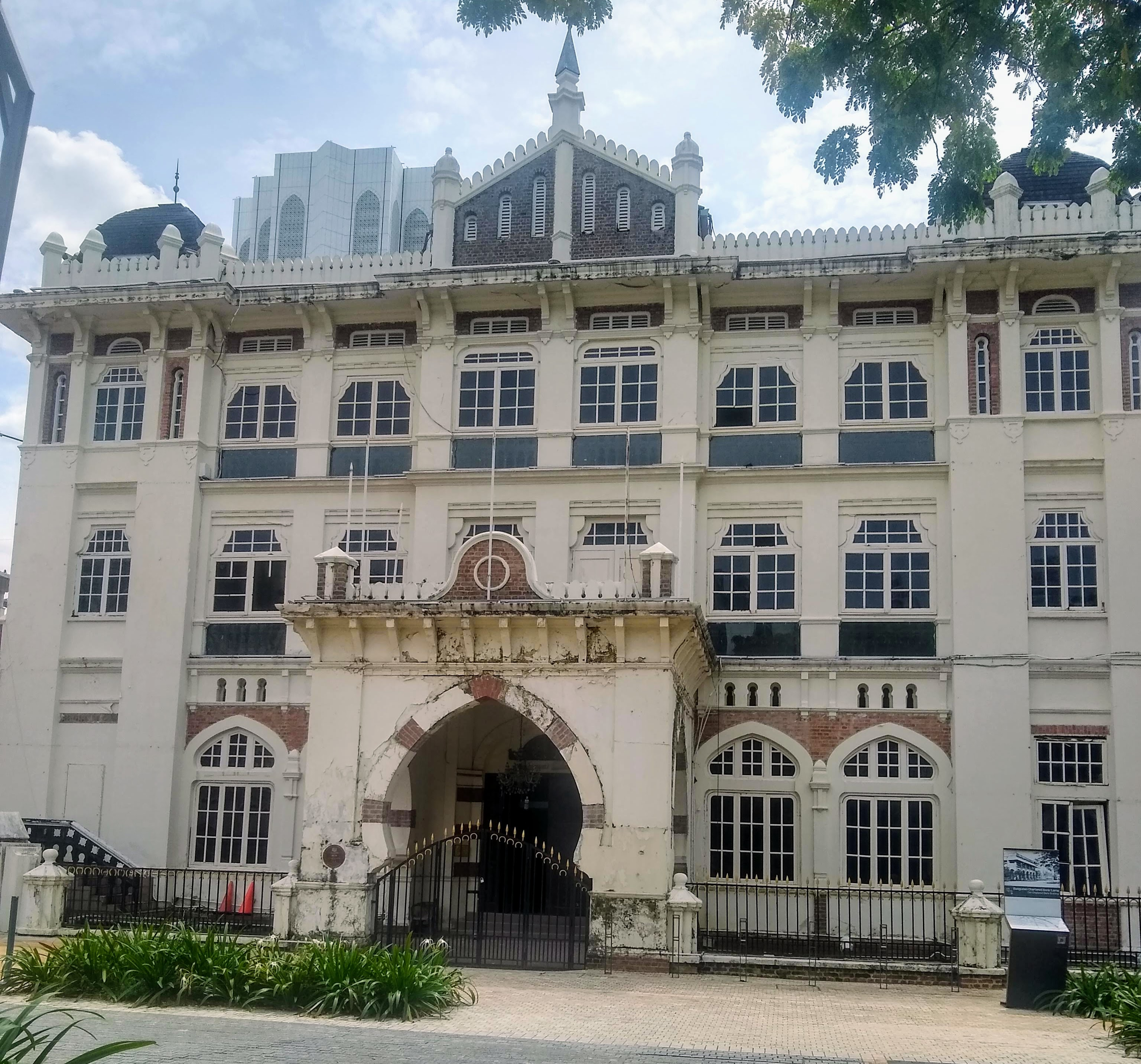

General information
- Status: Vacant
- Architectural style: Indo-Saracenic
- Address: Jalan Raja
- Town or city: Kuala Lumpur
- Country: Malaysia
- Opened: December 1909

Technical details
- Floor count: 3

The Standard Chartered Bank Building, is a historical building in Kuala Lumpur, Malaysia. Completed in 1909, it is situated on the south side of Independence Square, and served as the main branch of the former Chartered Bank of India, Australia and China which was later absorbed into Standard Chartered Bank.

== History ==
Chartered Bank of India, Australia and China, known as Chartered Bank, founded in London in 1853, became the leading bank in British Malaya, and was the first bank to be established in Kuala Lumpur when it opened a branch in Market Street (now Leboh Pasar Besar) above a row of shop houses in 1888.

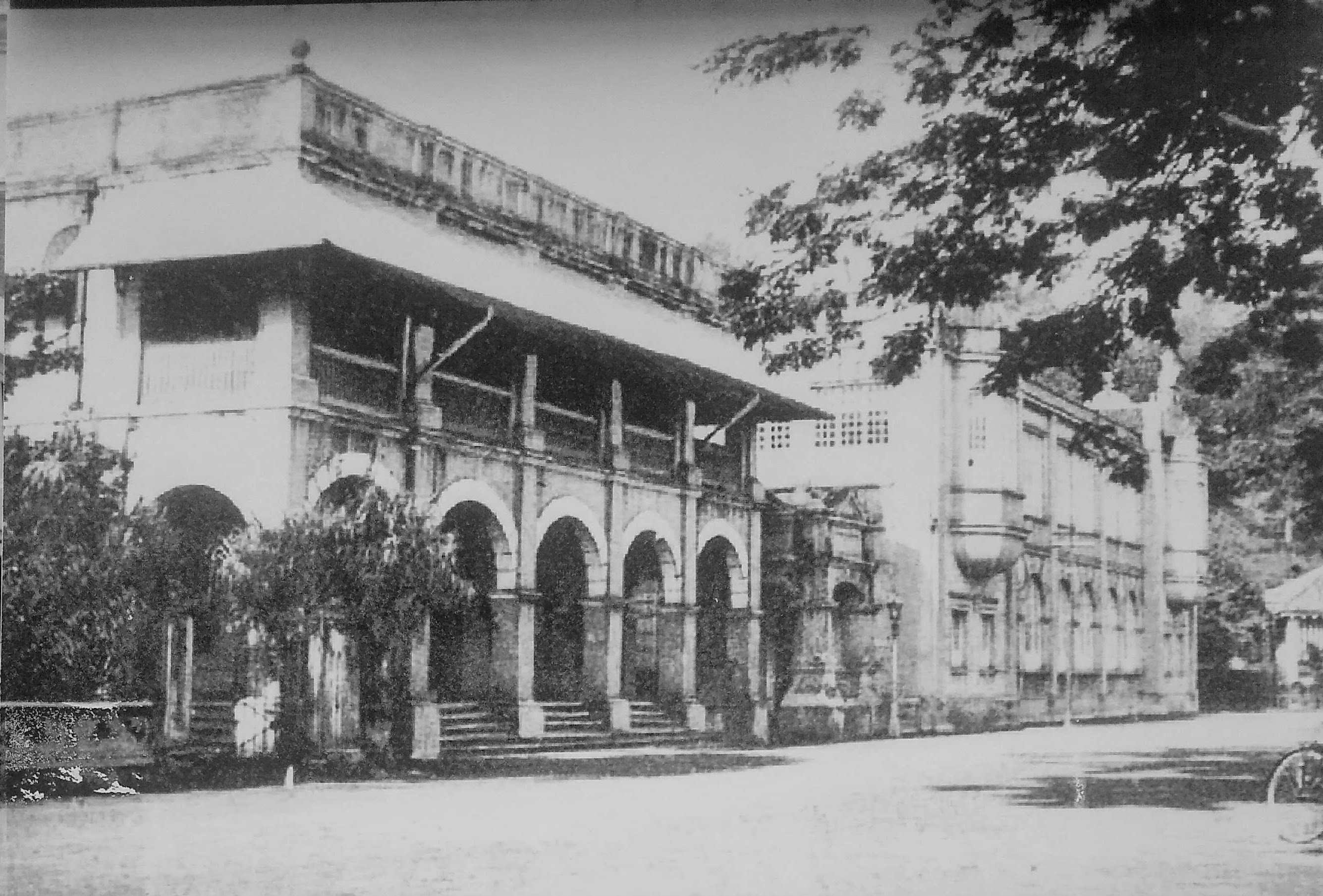
The old bank building which was demolished in the 1900s to make way for the current building

In 1891, the bank moved to new premises at the current site which, due to the proximity of the police headquarters in Bluff Road (now Jalan Bukit Aman), was considered more secure. The new premises, consisting of a single storey, soon proved inadequate due to the bank's rapid expansion of its business, and a new three-storey building was commissioned to replace it which was opened in December 1909.

In 1926, when the Klang and Gomback rivers burst their banks due to heavy rain, the bank was flooded and millions of dollars of bank notes and bank documents were laid outside on the ground to dry.

During the 1960s, the building served temporarily as the National History Museum while the construction of Malaysia's new National Museum was taking place. Other tenants have included the District and Land Office, and the Department of Islamic Affairs of the Federal Territories, and from 2015 to 2017 it was home to the Music Museum.

Currently vacant, concern has been raised regarding its dilapidating condition, while the Selangor Government has stated that it intends to convert the building into a tourist information centre.

The building has been gazetted as a National Heritage Building under the Antiquities Act.

== Description ==
The building's design, which incorporates elements of the Indo-Saracenic style, features horseshoe shaped arches around the porch and the windows on the ground floor, while windows on the upper floors feature scalloped edges. Four domes made of hardwood, are positioned at each corner of the roof.
