= Journal of the Malaysian Branch of the Royal Asiatic Society =

- Discipline: Asian studies
- Language: English

Publication details
- History: 1877–present
- Publisher: Malaysian Branch of the Royal Asiatic Society (Malaysia)
- Frequency: Biannual

Standard abbreviations
- ISO 4: J. Malays. Branch R. Asiat. Soc.

Indexing
- ISSN: 0126-7353

Links
- Journal homepage

The Journal of the Malaysian Branch of the Royal Asiatic Society (JMBRAS) is an academic journal published by the Malaysian Branch of the Royal Asiatic Society (MBRAS). The journal covers topics of historical interest concerning Peninsular Malaysia, Sabah, Sarawak, Labuan and Singapore. It was founded in 1877 in Singapore.

== History ==
The journal has been published under three different names through its history. The journal was first founded in 1877 by a group of British colonial administrators in Singapore and published as the Journal of the Straits Branch of the Royal Asiatic Society (JSBRAS) and published at six-monthly intervals by the Straits Branch of the Royal Asiatic Society (SBRAS). The first volume came out in September 1878 (but bore 'July 1878' as its publication date). The final volume of JSBRAS was JSBRAS 86, published in November 1922.

In 1923 SBRAS was renamed the Malayan Branch of the Royal Asiatic Society (MBRAS), in response to the increasing sphere of influence of the British over the Malay Peninsula and its surrounding areas. As a result of this change of name, the name of the Society's Journal was changed to the Journal of the Malayan Branch of the Royal Asiatic Society (JMBRAS). The numbering started at 1, with each volume having several parts (e.g. JMBRAS volume 1, part 1 was published in April 1923, JMBRAS volume 1, part 2 in October 1923 and volume 1, part 3 in December of the same year). Publication of JMBRAS was interrupted by the Japanese invasion of Malaya in World War II: the last issue (volume 19 part 3) came out in December 1941. Publication resumed with volume 20 part 1 in June 1947.

In 1964, with the formation of Malaysia, comprising Malaya, Sabah, Sarawak and Singapore, again the name of the Society was changed from Malayan Branch to Malaysian Branch. The first issue of the Journal of the Malaysian Branch of the Royal Asiatic Society (JMBRAS) was volume 37, part 1.

The journal originally carried articles on the history and natural history of the region, but now concentrates on the history of Malaysia and the surrounding region.
