= Basil Roberts =

Anglican bishop (1887–1957)

Basil Coleby Roberts DD (23 September 1887 – 3 February 1957) was an Anglican bishop in the first half of the 20th century.

Born into a clerical family on 23 September 1887 in Cheltenham, Gloucestershire — his father was the Rev. Henry Eugene Roberts and his grandfather was the Rev. Charles Coleby Roberts — he was educated at Allhallows School Honiton, Marlborough College and Pembroke College, Cambridge, where he was awarded a John Stewart of Rannoch Scholarship for the study of Greek and Latin in 1907. Roberts received his B.A. degree in 1909 and M.A. degree in 1914. He attended Wells Theological College and was ordained deacon in 1911 and priest in 1912. His first post was as a Curate at St Jude's, Salterhebble. He was a Lecturer at St Augustine's College, Canterbury from 1913 to 1922.

From 1915 to 1919, Roberts was a temporary Chaplain to His Majesty's Armed Forces, serving in Singapore and Siberia. He was Chaplain of Selangor from 1922 to 1927 when he became Bishop of Singapore, a post he held until 1940. From 1941 to 1945, Roberts served as Warden of St Augustine's College, Canterbury. He was an Assistant Bishop of Canterbury from 1942 to 1955. From 1944 until his death on 3 February 1957 at his home in Chislehurst, south-east London, Roberts was Secretary of the Society for the Propagation of the Gospel in Foreign Parts. He was conferred an honorary D.D. degree in 1951.

In 1922, Roberts married Dorothy Mary Somerville, a physician. She was the daughter of Scottish naturalist Alexander Somerville (1842–1907) and his second wife Euphemia Gilchrist Gibb. Her paternal grandfather was the Rev. Dr. Alexander Neil Somerville. Roberts and his wife had a son and three daughters. Dorothy Mary Roberts (1896–1982) was made an officer of the Civil Division of the Most Excellent Order of the British Empire in the 1937 Coronation Honours for her social services in the Straits Settlements. From 1953 to 1961, she served as president of the Anglican Mothers' Union.

Church of England titles
Preceded by Charles Ferguson-Davie	Bishop of Singapore; 1927 – 1940	Succeeded by Leonard Wilson
