= Malaysian Branch of the Royal Asiatic Society =

Learned society

The Malaysian Branch of the Royal Asiatic Society (MBRAS) is a learned society based in Kuala Lumpur, Malaysia.

Established in 1877, the society is dedicated to the collection, recording and communication of geographic, historical, and cultural information about Malaya, Singapore and Brunei. A primary objective of the society is to encourage the study of the region by publishing a journal and undertaking other scholarly activities. Although affiliated with the Royal Asiatic Society of Great Britain and Ireland (RAS), it is completely autonomous, thanks to financial support from the governments of Malaysia, Singapore and Brunei and other organizations. Members, however, have access to the library facilities of the RAS when in London.

== History ==
The society was founded in Singapore in 1877 as the Straits Asiatic Society by a small group of expatriates led by Archdeacon (later Bishop) George Hose. In 1878, having sought and obtained an affiliation with the RAS, it became the Straits Branch of the Royal Asiatic Society with 150 founding members, many of whom were colonial administrators. Archdeacon Hose became the first president, serving as such until 1908. Today the society has more than 1,000 members.

During the colonial period the society was supported by grants from the government and donations from the Sultans of the Malay States and also benefitted from various privileges, such as government-provided premises and printing facilities. In 1923 the society's name was changed to recognise political changes to the Malayan Branch of the Royal Asiatic Society and in 1954, when the Society was also relocated to Kuala Lumpur, to its current name.

The journal has been published since the very early days of the society, initially as the Journal of the Straits Branch of the Royal Asiatic Society and currently as the Journal of the Malaysian Branch of the Royal Asiatic Society. Since then, the society has published 309 journals issues and 48 monographs. The journal is considered the oldest active publication in the region.

== Presidents ==
- 1878–1880: Archdeacon George Hose
- c.1883: Hon. Charles John Irving
- c.1885–1888: Hon. Allan Maclean Skinner
- 1888–1891: Sir John Frederick Dickson
- 1894–1908: Bishop George Hose
- 1908–1913: Sir David J. Galloway
- 1914–1915: Rev W. G. Shellabear
- 1916–1918: C.J. Saunders
- 1919: Hon. William George Maxwell
- 1920–1921: Hon. Sir James William Murison
- 1922–1923: Hon. William George Maxwell
- 1924: Hon. Edward Shaw Hose
- 1925–1926: Hon. William George Maxwell
- 1927: Sir Richard Olaf Winstedt
- 1929: Sir Richard Olaf Winstedt
- 1930: C. Boden Kloss
- 1931– 1933: Sir Richard Olaf Winstedt
- 1936: Charles Edward Wurtzburg
- 1937: John Vivian Mills
- 1941: S.W. Jones
- 1948–1951: Sir Roland Braddell
- 1952–1955: Michael W.F. Tweedie
- 1956–1964: Carl Alexander Gibson-Hill
- 1965–1978: Tan Sri Nik Ahmad Kamil
- 1978–1993: Tun Mohamed Suffian bin Hashim
- 1993–1995: Prof. Dato Khoo Kay Kim
- 1996–2006: Datuk Abdullah bin Ali
- 2007–: Tun Mohammed Hanif bin Omar
