= Diocese of Singapore and Malaya =

Former Anglican diocese of Singapore and Peninsular Malaysia

Diocese of Singapore and Malaya was an Anglican diocese which covered Singapore and West Malaysia (which was also called Malaya). It was renamed from Diocese of Singapore on 6 February 1960. On 8 April 1970, the diocese was dissolved and split into Diocese of Singapore and Diocese of West Malaysia.

== Bishops ==
| Name | Term | Notes |
|---|---|---|
| Cyril Kenneth Sansbury | 1961 - 1966 | |
| Joshua Chiu Ban It | 1967 - 1970 | |

== See also ==
- Diocese of Singapore (1909)
- Diocese of West Malaysia
- Anglican Diocese of Singapore
- Anglican Communion
- Anglicanism
