= Euphemia Somerville =

Scottish social worker and local politician

- Born: 19 September 1860; Dollar, Scotland
- Died: 27 September 1935 (aged 75); Edinburgh, Scotland

Euphemia Gilchrist Gibb, later Euphemia Gilchrist Somerville, (19 September 1860 – 27 September 1935) was a Scottish social worker and local politician.

== Life ==
Somerville was born in Dollar in 1860 in Clackmannanshire. Her mother was Margaret Scott (born McMinn) and her father was William Gibb, who worked as a draper. She went to the Dollar Academy.

She became the second wife of Alexander Somerville who was the eldest child of Alexander Neil Somerville. He was a retired merchant and he already had three daughters and together they had another three children. They both worked to create a herbarium. He died in 1907 and in the following year she began working in Glasgow where she was shocked by the poverty of the children there. The council asked for her help and she organised volunteers to visit poor families to help reduce the high rate of infant mortality.

Edinburgh council liked the work she was doing and asked her to repeat the scheme in their city. In 1908 she and Mrs Hamilton Maxwell started the Edinburgh Voluntary Health Workers' Association as part of the council's child welfare department. By 1911 she was living in Colinton.

The Edinburgh Women Citizens' Association (EWCA) began in 1918 to assist the middle-class women who had gained the vote. The Association backed her bid to be a town councillor representing the Murchiston ward and Ella Morison Millar was also an EWCA councillor. When elected she went to live for a while at the Craiglockhart poorhouse to find out the main problems and this informed her studies at the University of Edinburgh which had a course for women interested in social work and reform. The EWCA had a wide range of ambitions to improve life in the city. Somerville sat on many of the committees. As an independent she could not use her party's influence, but she was also not at anyone's beck and call.

In 1925 she led an EWCA group looking at housing while at the same time serving on the main council housing committee.

In 1930 she led a sub-committee of the council who wanted to improve provision for the under fives.

== Death and legacy ==
Somerville died at her home in Edinburgh in 1935. One of her legacies was the nineteen children's playgrounds in Edinburgh for toddlers. She is also credited with causing a large amount of poorly designed housing to be built.
