= Steve Harper (Colonial police officer) =

British colonial police officer

- Born: 1856
- Died: 1896 (aged 39–40)
- Occupation: Police inspector in Malaya

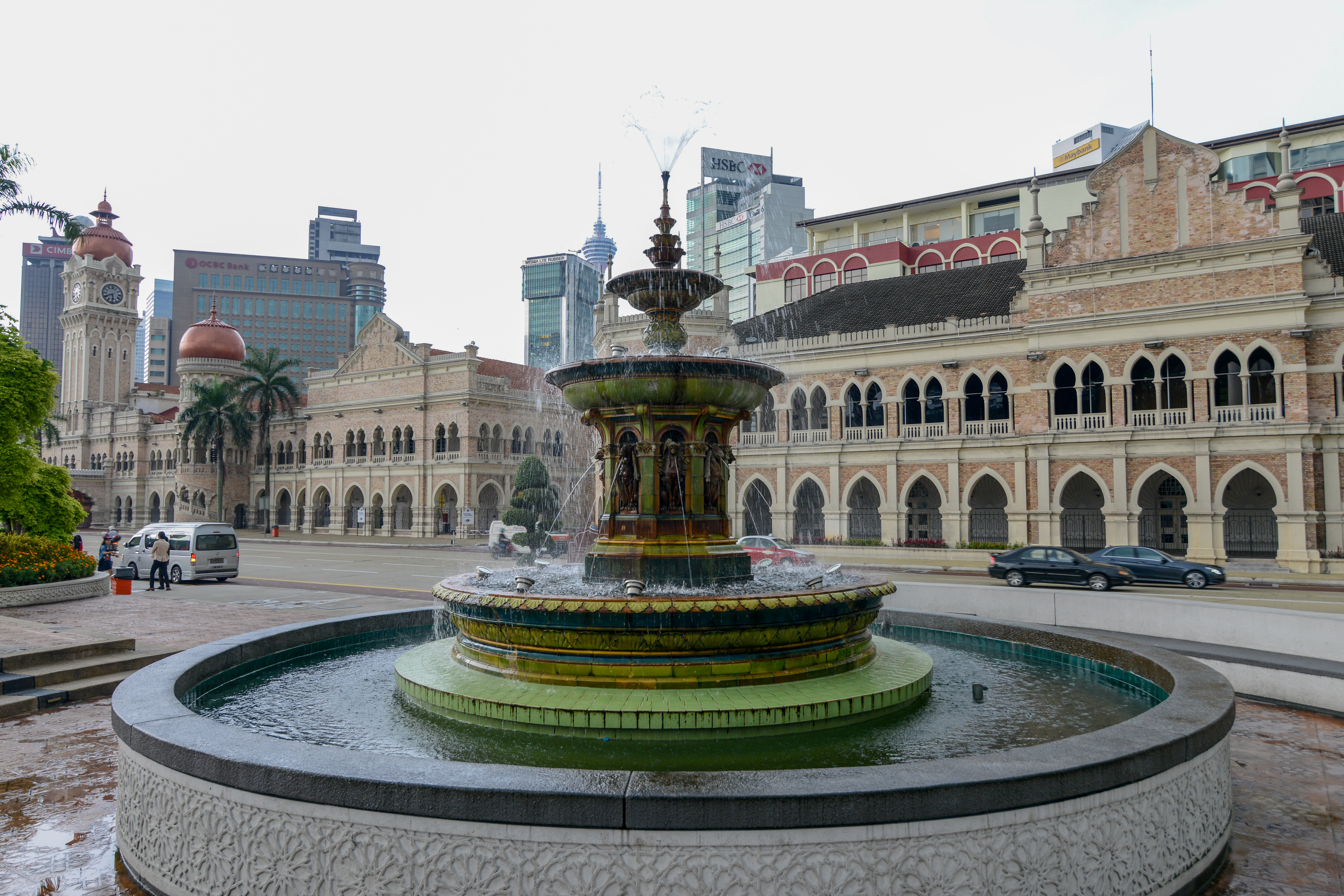
'Cop's Fountain' in Kuala Lumpur, erected in memory of policeman, Steve Harper, in 1897.

Steve Harper (1856–1896) was a British Inspector of Police in the state of Selangor in British Malaya. A fountain stands in the centre of Kuala Lumpur, Malaysia which was erected in his memory.

== Career ==
Harper was recruited to the British Government service in 1880 after residing in South Africa. At the time he was said to be a member of an acrobatic performance group where he met a man named Rankine who was a civil servant working in the British administration in Selangor, and they returned together to Kuala Lumpur.

There, Harper joined the police force as part of the first batch of European inspectors appointed by the Selangor police force, and remained with them for the next 16 years, reaching the position of Senior Inspector.

In May, 1896, he applied for a year's leave to recover from an illness, and travelled home where he died the same year, aged 40.

== Character and personal life ==
Harper, was a highly respected and popular police officer known locally as 'Tuan Steeb', who employed unconventional methods in the performance of his duties. He had a reputation as a skilful boxer, training his officers in the ring, and in one incident it was reported that he used his fists to good effect against the ringleaders of a Chinese riot, leaving his Malay officers to take them into custody.

Harper was joined in Selangor by two brothers: Archie from Australia, who became a successful businessman, and Alfred, who was chief clerk at the courts in Kuala Lumpur. After his death, his wife became the proprietress of the Victoria Hotel in Kuala Lumpur.

== Legacy ==
When Harper died, a committee was formed by senior members of the European community and a number of wealthy Chinese businessmen to collect donations for a suitable memorial to be erected in his name.

Two suggestions were proposed: the establishment of a Memorial Fund in Steve Harper's name at the Victoria Institution school for the benefit of poorer pupils, and, according to the suggestion of the British Resident, J.P. Rodger, a drinking fountain to be erected in Market Square. A vote was taken by the committee and the fountain was chosen by 13 votes to 12, it being erected in 1897, and became popularly known as 'Cop's Fountain'. The Victoria Institution Fund in Harper's name was also implemented.
