= Anglican Diocese of Singapore (1909) =

Diocese of Singapore was an Anglican diocese which covered the Straits Settlements, Peninsular Malaya, Siam, Java, Sumatra and adjacent islands. It was consecrated on 24 August 1909. Later the diocese was renamed Diocese of Singapore and Malaya on 6 February 1960. It should not be confused with the current Diocese of Singapore, created in 1970 when the Diocese of Singapore and Malaya was separated into the Dioceses of Singapore and West Malaysia.

== Bishop ==
Name	Term	Notes	Rf
Charles James Ferguson-Davie	1909–1927		
Basil Coleby Roberts	1927–1940		
John Leonard Wilson	1941–1949		
Henry Wolfe Baines	1949–1960		

== See also ==
- Diocese of Singapore and Malaya
- Diocese of West Malaysia
- Anglican Diocese of Singapore (1970)
- Anglican Communion
