= Alexander Neil Somerville =

Scottish minister and evangelist (1813–1889)

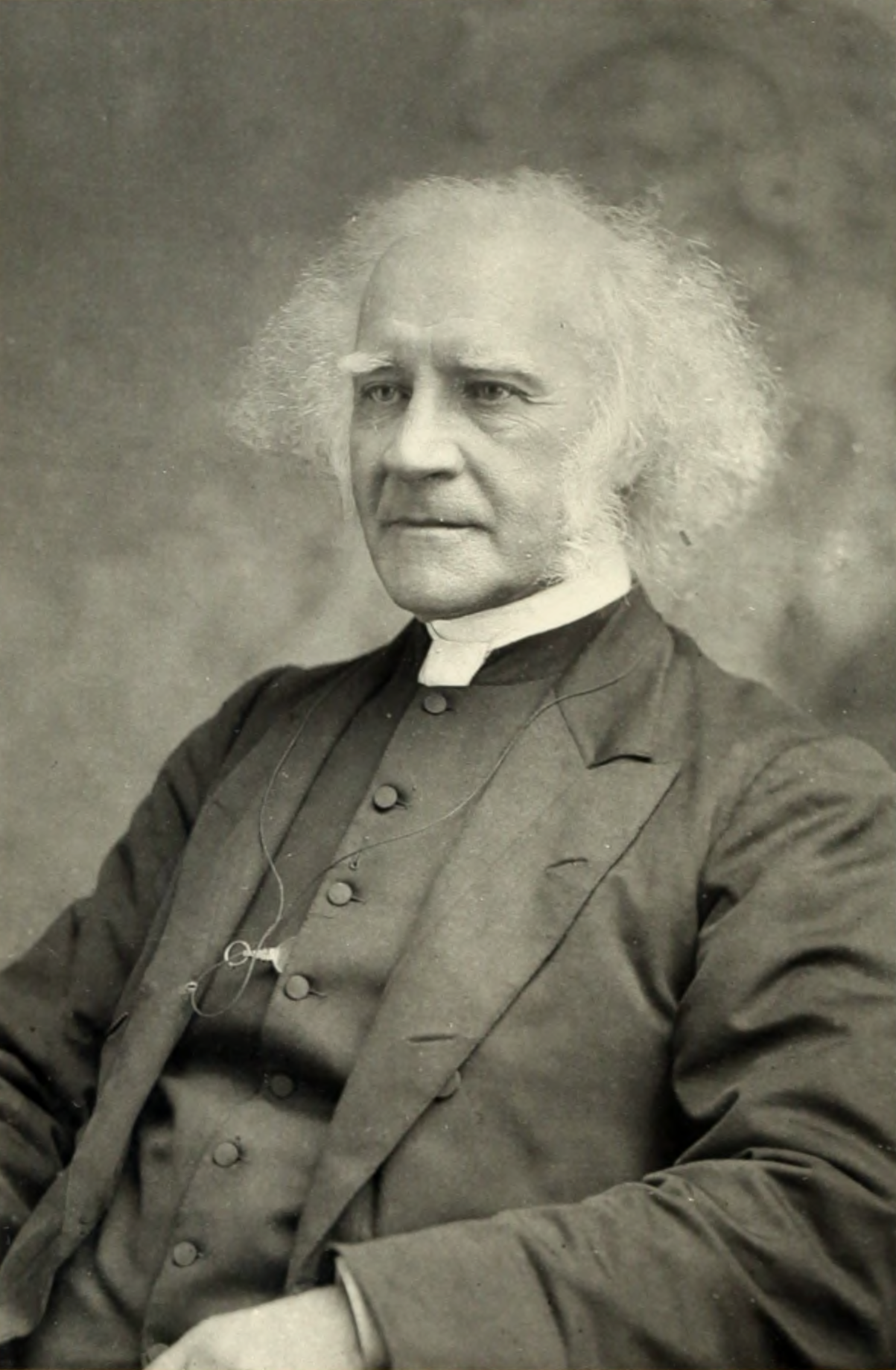
- Alexander Neil Somerville from Precious Seed

Personal details
- Born: 29 January 1813 Edinburgh, Scotland, UK
- Died: 18 September 1889 (aged 76) Glasgow, Scotland, UK

Alexander Neil Somerville (1813–1889) was a Scottish minister and evangelist, who served as Moderator of the General Assembly for the Free Church of Scotland at Inverness in 1886/87. Glasgow University called him "Missionary to the World".

== Life ==
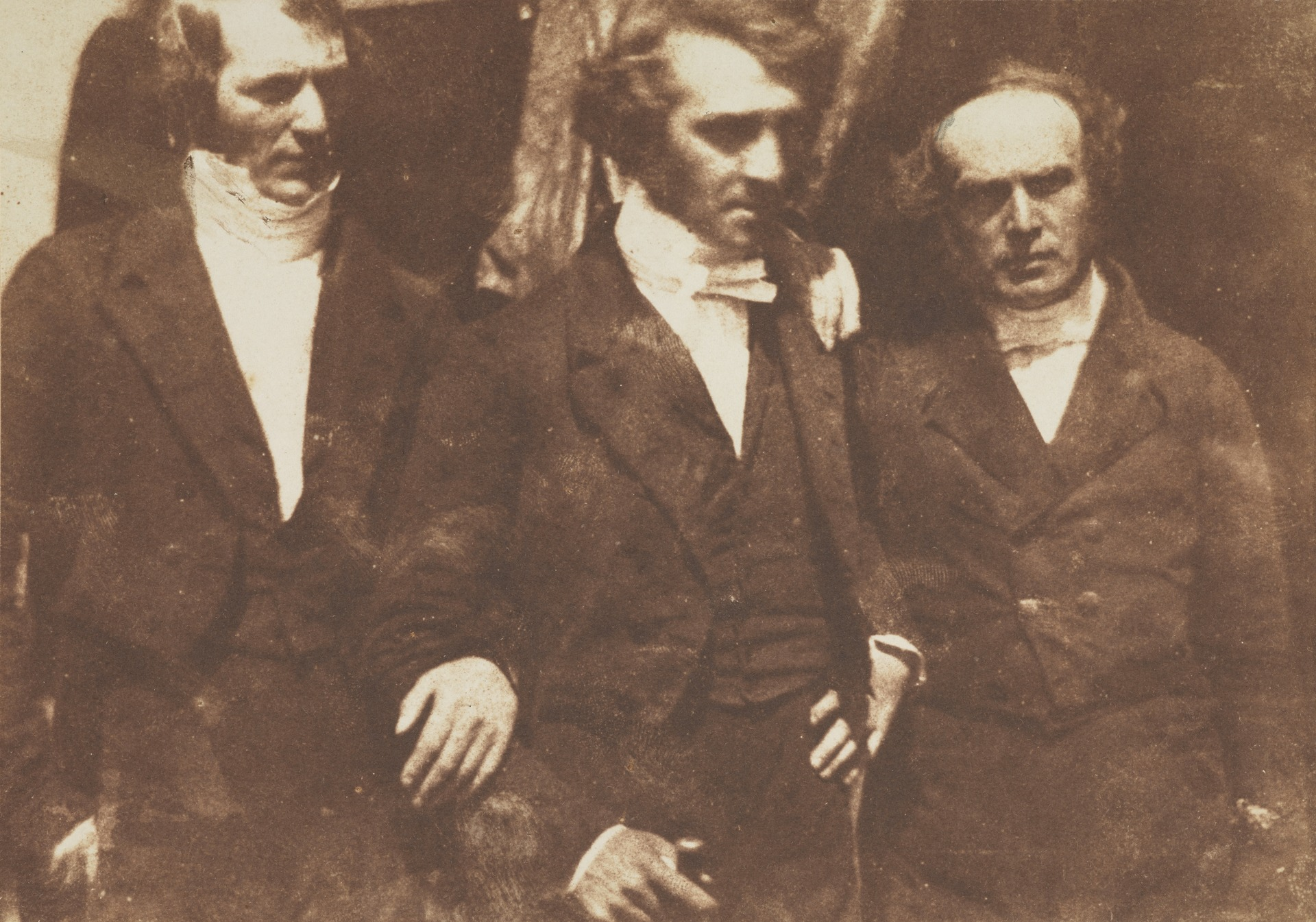
John Purves, Alexander Somerville and Horatius Bonar by Hill & Adamson

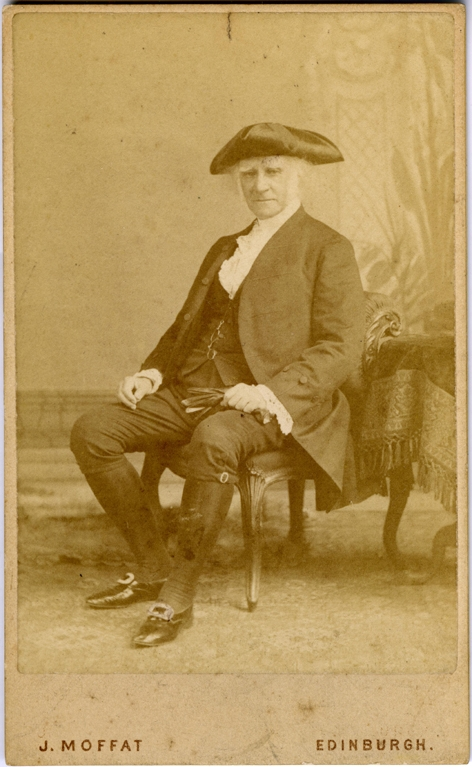
Alexander Somerville by John Moffat

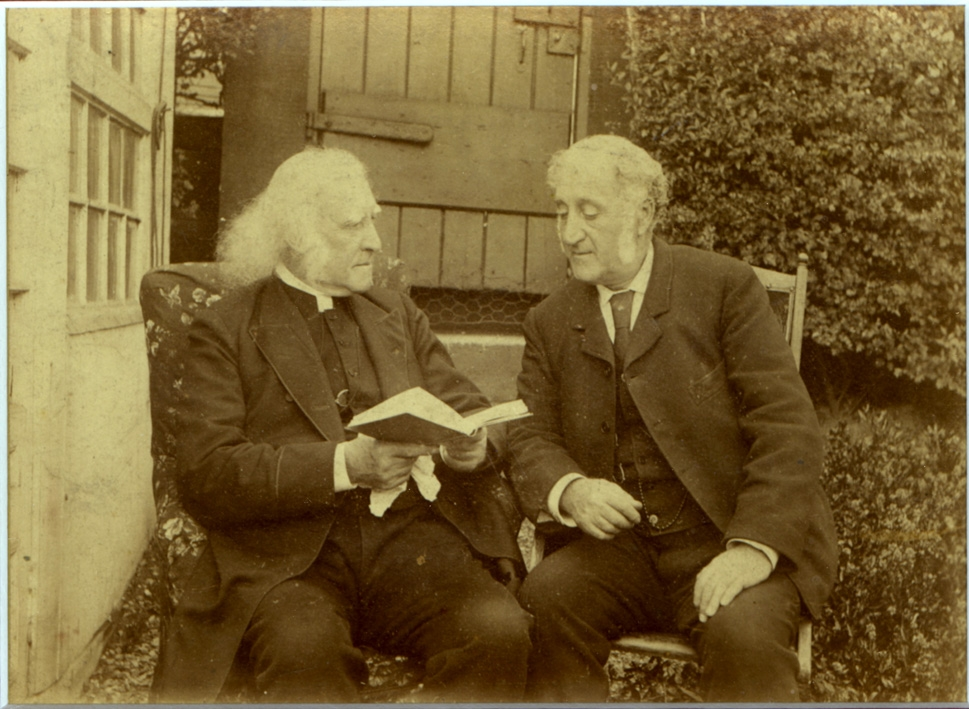
Alexander Somerville and Colin Somerville

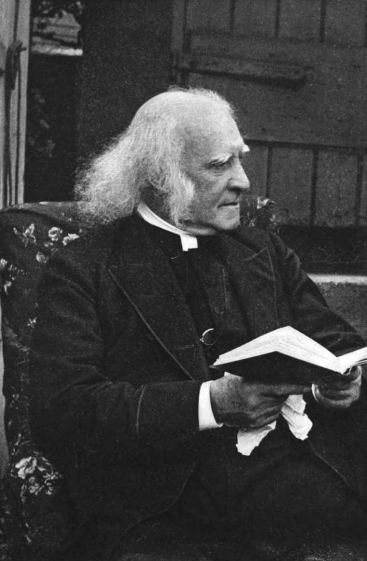
Alexander Neil Somerville from A Modern Apostle

He was born in Edinburgh on 29 January 1813, the eldest of eight children of Alexander Somerville, a wine-merchant living at 65 York Place, and his wife, Elizabeth Munro. He was educated at the High School on Calton Hill, his friends including Robert McCheyne and Horatius Bonar. He then studied Divinity at Edinburgh University.

He was ordained by the Church of Scotland at Anderston in Glasgow in 1837, replacing Rev Charles John Brown.

In the Disruption of 1843 he left the established Church of Scotland to join the Free Church of Scotland, a new church being built for him in Cadogan Street. Following this he became an evangelist for the Free Church in Canada, Spain and especially in India. In Spain he organised a confession of faith for Spanish Protestants.

In 1873 he had a legitimate claim to the title of Baron Somerville but did not press his claim.

In 1874 he was invited to India By Rev John Fordyce of the Anglo-Indian Union. He visited over 20 cities in six months including Calcutta, Agra, Allahabad, Madras, Delhi and Bombay. An avid traveller his later trips included Australia and New Zealand in 1877/78. The visit to Dunedin and Otago in New Zealand in May 1878 proved particularly influential in promoting the Free Presbyterian movement in that country. This was partially at the invitation of a family friend, Captain William Cargill.

Later trips included Italy in 1880, Germany and Russia in 1881, South Africa 1882/3, Greece and Turkey 1885/6. In the summer of 1886 he was elected Moderator of the General Assembly the highest position in his church. He was succeeded by Rev Robert Rainy in 1887. Following his year in office he returned to evangelism, this time concentrating on Jewish areas in Hungary and southern Russia.

In Budapest, Ármin Vámbéry will also appear at one of the performances organized especially for Jews. Vámbéry also helped the pastor in his work as an interpreter. He translated his words into German at the occasion organized specifically for Jews. In Szolnok, he visited Izsák Lichtenstein, the rabbi of Tapioszele who had already resigned.

He died at home, 11 South Park Terrace in Glasgow on 18 September 1889. He is buried in the Western Necropolis, Glasgow.

== Publications ==
- A Course of Lectures on the Jews (1839)
- Sacred Triads, Doctrinal and Practical (1859)
- A Day in Laodicea (1861)
- The Churches in Asia (1885)
- Evangelism of the World (1886)
- Precious Seeds Sown in Many Lands (1890-posthumously) [with Memoir by his son, William Francis Somerville

== Family ==
He married 10 June 1841, Isabella Mirrlees (died 3 July 1900), daughter of James Ewing of Halifax, Nova Scotia, and had issue —

- Alexander, B.Sc, merchant, Calcutta, afterwards of Glasgow, born 25 March 1842, died 5 June 1907 (married twice, latterly to Euphemia (born Gibb) politician and social worker )
- James Ewing, M.A., B.D., minister of Free Church, Langholm, Broughty-Ferry, and U.F. Church, Mentone, editor of the Continental Presbyterian. born 1843
- Marianne, born 8 July 1845 (married 14 November 1865, George Halley Knight, of Dollar, Clackmannanshire. minister of Free Church, Bearsden), died 12 May 1902
- Eliza, born 14 July 1848 (married Jonathan Kerr, lieut.-col. Bengal Staff Corps)
- William Francis, M.A., B.Sc, M.B., CM., M.D., physician in Glasgow, lieut.-col. commanding 2/1 Lowland Field Ambulance, R.A.M.C. (T.), born 14 June 1858.
