= Charles Ferguson-Davie =

Anglican bishop (1872–1963)

Charles James Ferguson-Davie DD (16 March 1872 – 11 September 1963) was an Anglican bishop, the first Bishop of Singapore, appointed in 1910.

== Early life and education ==
Born into a clerical family on 16 March 1872 in Yelverton, Norfolk, Ferguson-Davie was educated at Marlborough College and Trinity Hall, Cambridge, receiving his B.A. degree in 1894 and M.A. degree in 1899. He attended Leeds Clergy School and was ordained a deacon in 1896 and a priest in 1898. His first post was as a curate at St Paul, Preston. He then became a USPG missionary.

== Missionary work ==
Arriving in the Punjab Province of British India in 1899, Ferguson-Davie served as domestic chaplain to Bishop of Lahore George Lefroy until 1902. He was then assigned to Rewari until 1907 before serving in Rawalpindi until 1909.

Ferguson-Davie served as the first bishop of the Anglican Diocese of Singapore from 1909 to 1927. He was conferred an honorary D.D. degree by the University of Cambridge in 1909.

In later life, Ferguson-Davie was also a Priest and Warden in Natal. When he died on 11 September 1963 in Pietermaritzburg, he was the Church’s most senior bishop, having been consecrated 54 years earlier on 24 August 1909 in St. Paul's Cathedral, London.

== Personal life ==
His paternal grandfather was Henry Ferguson Davie. In 1902, he married Charlotte Elizabeth Hull, a physician working in a British mission hospital. They adopted a daughter. After his wife's death in 1943, he remarried with Marie Antoinette Jacobine (Hax) Randles, the widow of a South African barrister, in 1948.

Church of England titles
New title	Bishop of Singapore; 1909–1927	Succeeded by Basil Roberts
