= George Hose =

Anglican clergyman (1838–1922)

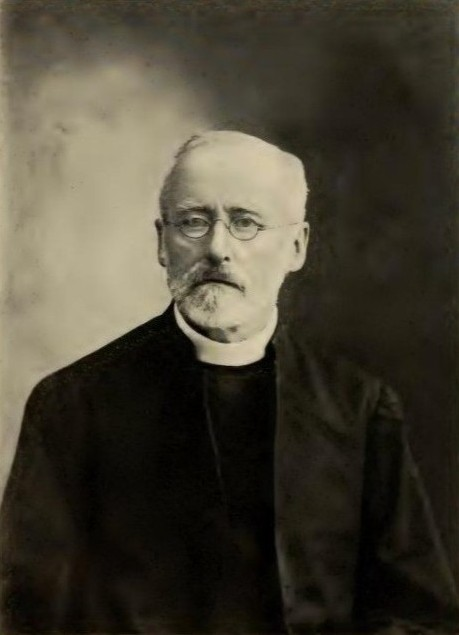
Rt. Rev. George Frederick Hose, D.D.

George Frederick Hose DD (3 September 1838 – 26 March 1922) was an Anglican clergyman, Bishop of Singapore, Labuan and Sarawak from 1881 to 1909.

== Biography ==
Hose was born on 3 September 1838 in Brunswick Place, Cambridge, the son of Frederick Hose, a cleric, and his wife, Mary Ann Knight. He was educated at St John's College, Cambridge, where he gained a B.A. degree in 1862 and an M.A. degree in 1867 and was ordained deacon in 1861 and priest in 1862. He began his career with curacies at Roxton and Marylebone. He was Chaplain of Malacca then Archdeacon of Singapore before his elevation to the episcopate. Upon his elevation, he was conferred an honorary D.D. degree by the University of Cambridge.

In 1877, Hose promoted the founding of the Straits Asiatic Society, later the Malaysian Branch of the Royal Asiatic Society, and subsequently served as the society's president from 1878 to 1908. He had a particular interest in collecting botanical specimens.

He retired in 1909 and died on 26 March 1922 at the Manor House in Normandy, Surrey.

He was married to Emily Harriet Kerbey (1841–1904), the daughter of surgeon John Kerbey (1804–1842), in 1867, and had children.

- Their son Edward Shaw Hose (1871–1946) was a civil servant in Malaya and was also President of the Asiatic Society branch.
- Their son Walter Hose (1875–1965) was a naval officer who retired as a Canadian rear admiral.
- Their daughter Elfrida Mary Hose (1879–1960) was married by her father at the Cathedral Singapore to Rev. Charles Hampden Basil Woodd (1869–1941), Principal and later Chaplain of Momoyama Middle school for boys at Osaka, Japan, from 1902–15, later lived in Essex; they left five children.
- Their daughter Gertrude Hose (1883–1977) was a noted botanical collector, obtaining specimens primarily while living with her father in Sarawak from 1903 to 1908 and her brother Edward in Malaya from 1923 to 1925.

Anglican Communion titles
Preceded by Walter Chambers	Bishop of Labuan and Sarawak; 1881 – 1909	Succeeded by William Robert Rupert Mounsey
