= Christianity in Singapore =

Singaporean Christians
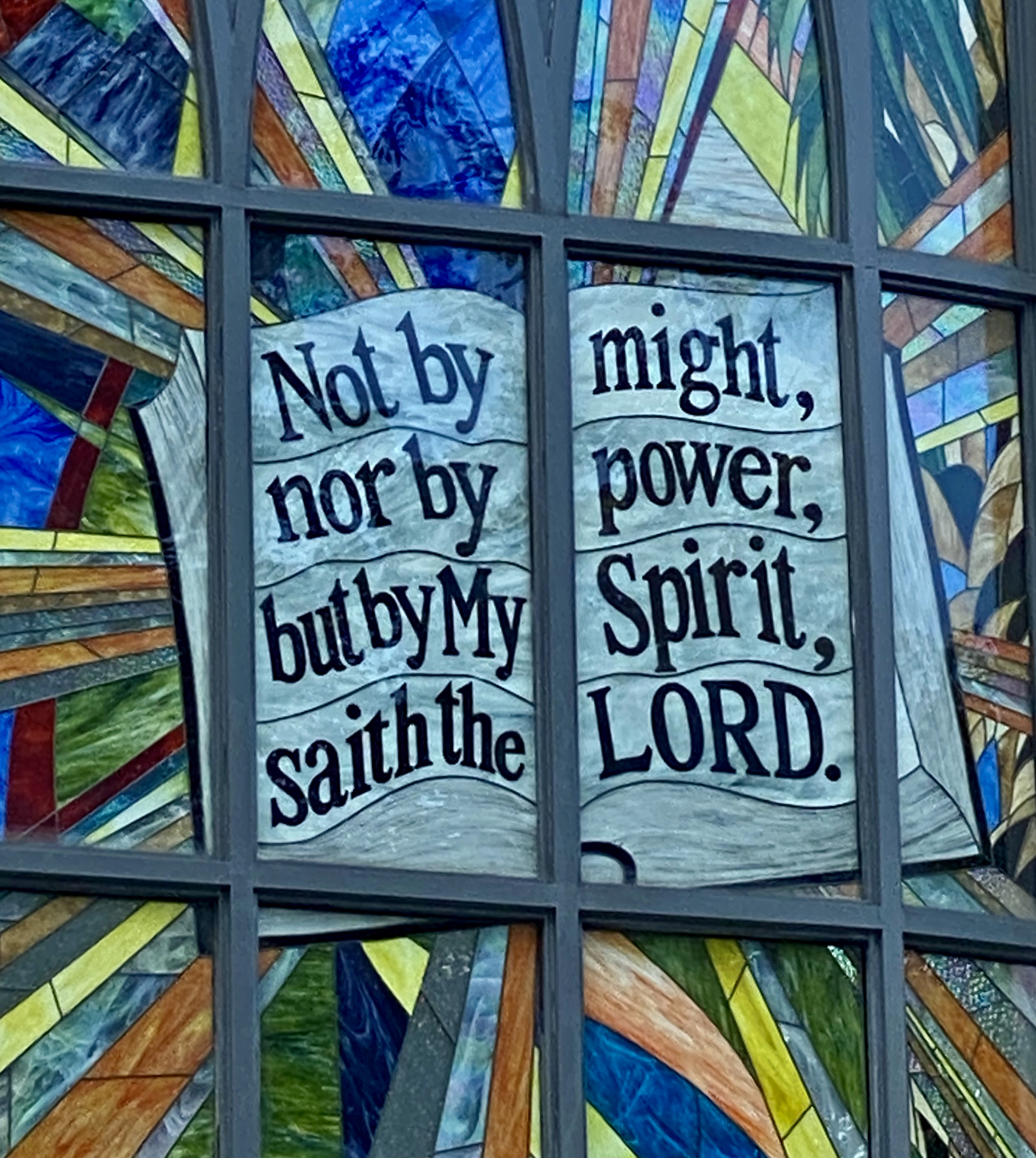
- A biblical verse inscribed on a stained glass window above the main entrance of Elim Church Singapore.

Total population
- 654,355 (2020 census) (19% of the resident (Note: In Singapore, the term "resident" refers to both citizens and permanent residents (PRs).) population)

Religions
- Anglicanism; Catholicism; Eastern Orthodoxy; Evangelicalism; Lutheranism; Methodism; Nontrinitarianism; Pentecostalism; Presbyterianism

Scriptures
- Bible

Languages
- Burmese · English · Filipino · Indonesian · Japanese · Korean · Mandarin · Tamil · Thai

Christians in Singapore constitute 17% of the country's resident population, as of the most recent census conducted in 2025. Christianity is the second largest religion in the country, after Buddhism and before Islam. In 2025, 17.1% Singaporean population identified as Christian, while 9.5% from Singaporean population identified as 'Other Christians', most of which identify as Protestant, with some identifying as Orthodox or other minority Christian denominations and 7.6% identified as members of Catholic Church.

Christianity was first introduced to Singapore by Anglicans, who were among the first British settlers to arrive shortly after the founding of a British colony by Stamford Raffles. The proportion of Christians among Singaporeans had initially increased in the last few decades: 9.9% in 1980; 12.7% in 1990; 14.6% in 2000 and 18.9% in 2020, but began to fall afterwards to 17.1% in 2025. Some Singaporeans were converted to the faith or were born into Christian families.

The majority of Christian churches are under the umbrella of the National Council of Churches of Singapore (NCCS). Most belong to Protestant traditions which consist of an array of denominations. Another major umbrella group is the Alliance of Pentecostal & Charismatic Churches Singapore (APCCS), a network of local churches, Christian organisations and pastors from largely independent charismatic churches and the Assemblies of God denomination.

== Overview ==
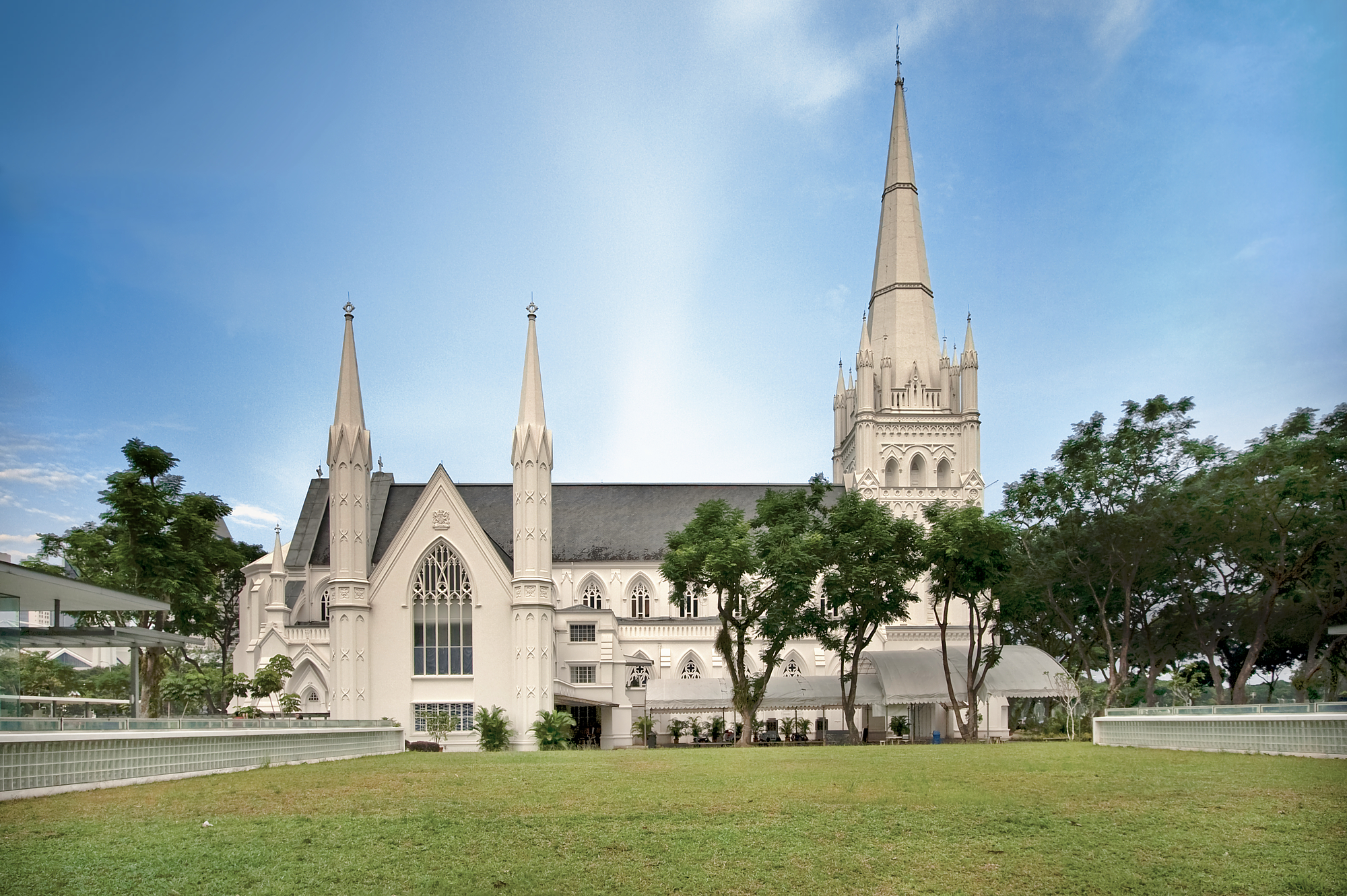
Saint Andrew's Cathedral is the principal church of the Anglican Diocese of Singapore. It was gazetted a national monument by Singapore's National Heritage Board on 28 June 1973.

=== Catholicism ===
==== Roman Catholicism ====
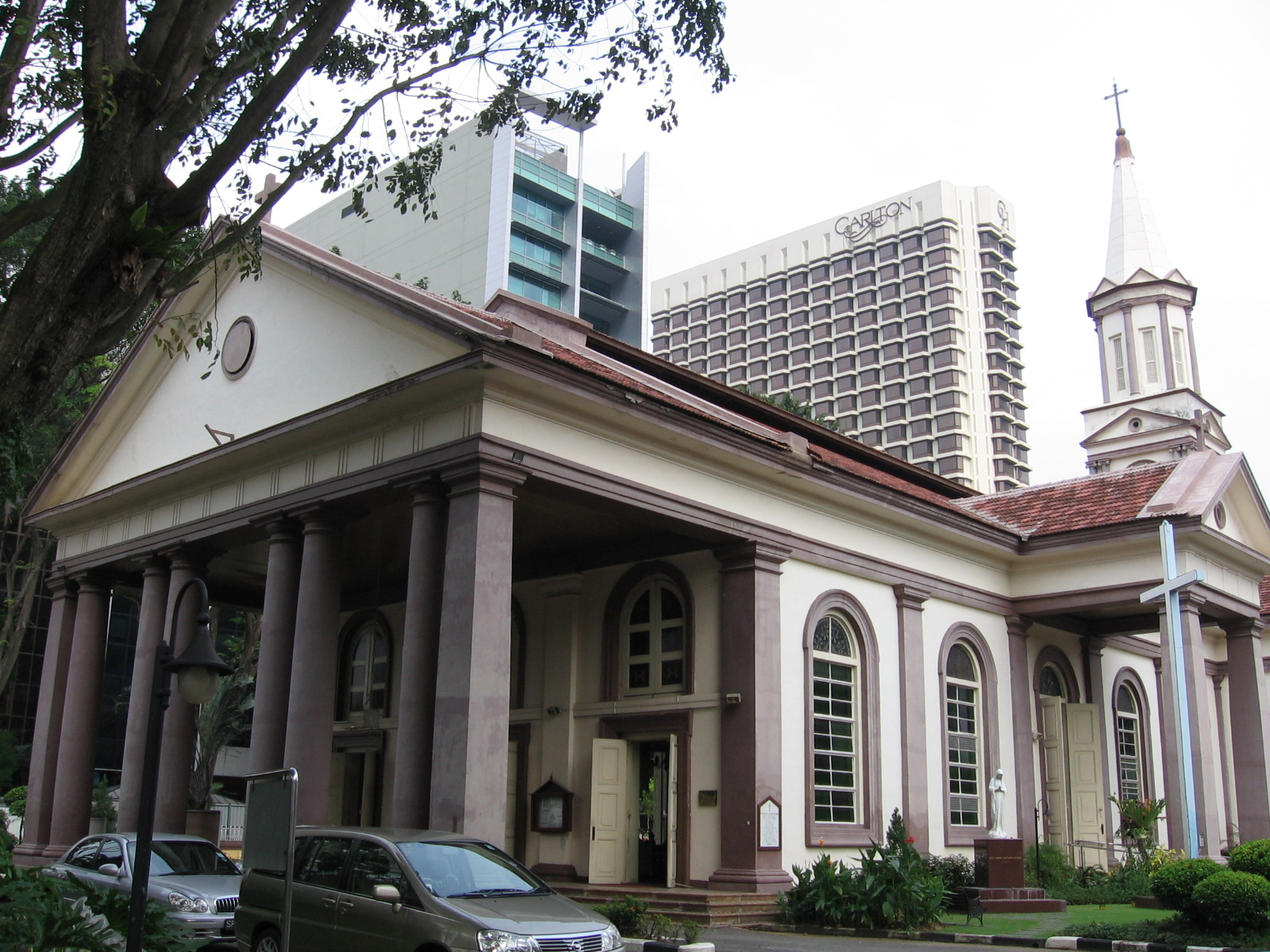
The Cathedral of the Good Shepherd is the oldest Catholic church in Singapore.

According to the 2025 Singapore Department of Statistics, there are an estimated 275.400 Catholics in the country, representing 7.6% from Singapore's population.

The Roman Catholic population in Singapore generally consists of Chinese (including Peranakans) and Indians, along with a few smaller minority groups such as Eurasians (including Kristang), white Europeans and Filipinos. The Chinese, the majority ethnicity in Singapore, also account for the majority of Catholics. There are 29 Roman Catholic parishes and 3 devotional churches in Singapore, each administering to a particular district in Singapore. Plans for a 33rd church at Tengah Gardens are in the works, after a successful bidding for land from the Housing Development Board.

Singapore has a Roman Catholic Archdiocese headed by Archbishop William Cardinal Goh who presides at the Cathedral of the Good Shepherd. The Holy Mass in Singapore is celebrated in numerous vernacular tongues, including English, Chinese language (Mandarin, Cantonese, Hokkien, Teochew, etc.), Malayalam, Korean, German, Indonesian, Tamil and Tagalog (at the Cathedral of the Good Shepherd). The Traditional Latin Mass is also celebrated every Sunday at 2pm at St. Joseph's Church (Victoria Street).

Peranakan Roman Catholics are generally concentrated in the Church of the Holy Family in Katong; whilst St. Joseph's Church along Victoria street is a cultural base for Portuguese Eurasians. Roman Catholic parishes in the 18th to early 19th centuries were initially set up along racial and cultural lines by various Roman Catholic missionary groups from Europe.

Various Roman Catholic parishes in Singapore are actively involved in social services such as welfare homes, the opening of soup kitchens as well as missionary trips to places like Indonesia and the Philippines. There is also the Catholic Medical Guild, and other Catholic lobby groups that are based in the Church of St Peter & Paul parish grounds.

Neighbourhood Christian Communities (NCC) take an active role in organising and gathering Catholics in the community, especially within their neighbourhoods, so that they may support one another spiritually and grow in Christ.

==== Eastern Catholicism ====
A fledgling Greek-Catholic community, dependent on the Ukrainian Greek-Catholic bishop of Melbourne, is also present.

A Syro-Malabar Catholic community in Singapore has been set up to cater to the growing Malayali diaspora. The Qurbana is celebrated at various Roman Catholic churches around the country: the Church of St. Antony in Woodlands, the Church of the Transfiguration in Punggol, the Church of St. Stephen in MacPherson, the Church of St. Mary of the Angels in Bukit Batok and St. Patrick's House Chapel in Bedok. All of these are only monthly, except that at St. Patrick's House Chapel. Only the Qurbana at the Church of St. Stephen is on Sunday, the rest are celebrated on Saturday.

=== Protestantism ===
Local Protestant denominations consist of: Anglicans, Methodists, Pentecostals, Baptists, Reformed (mostly Presbyterians and Dutch Reformed), Lutherans, and Evangelical Free Church. There are also nondenominational churches from the Churches of Christ, Plymouth Brethren, and Charismatic Christian traditions.

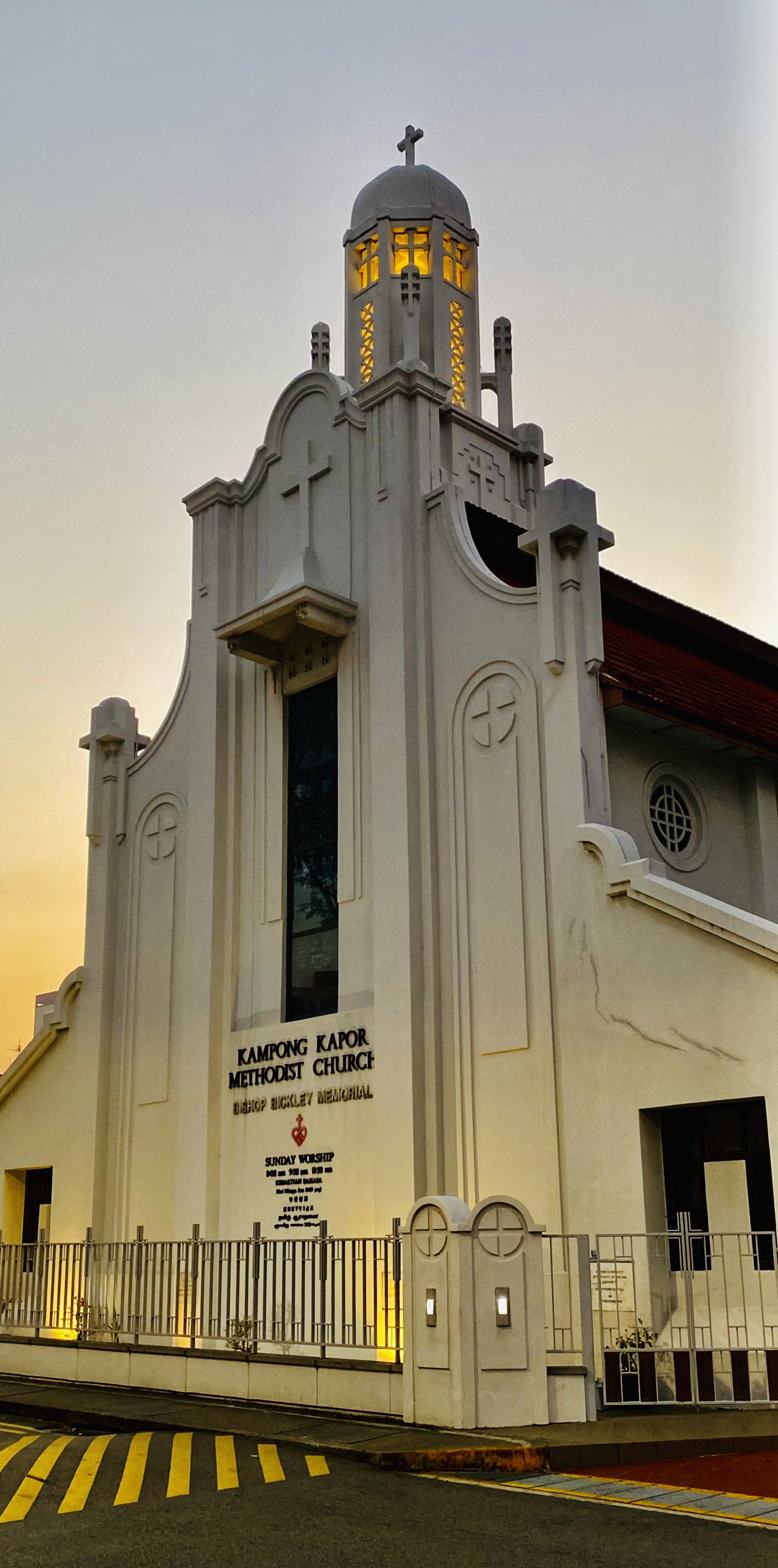
Kampong Kapor Methodist Church was founded in 1894. It initially functioned as a church on 155 Middle Road. In 1930, the church moved to its present location on 1 Kampong Kapor Road.

Anglicanism is represented in Singapore by the Diocese of Singapore, which has 26 parishes in Singapore, and is a part of the Church of the Province of South East Asia.

The Methodist Church in Singapore is the largest mainline Protestant denomination in the country, with some 45,000 members in 46 churches.

Pentecostalism has exerted a larger influence with the start of the charismatic movement in the 1970s. There are other organisations such as, Fei Yue Family Centres, Teen Challenge various community hospitals, and Beulah.

Prominent megachurches include New Creation Church, City Harvest Church and Faith Community Baptist Church, which count among Singapore's 10 largest charities, according to a report by The Straits Times in 2019.

The City Harvest Church Criminal Breach of Trust Case had involved the misappropriation of approximately S$50.6 million in church funds by church founder Kong Hee and five other key leaders in the church. It is the largest case of its kind in the history of Singapore, with Kong Hee and the other leaders ultimately found guilty and served prison sentences.

=== Oriental Orthodoxy ===
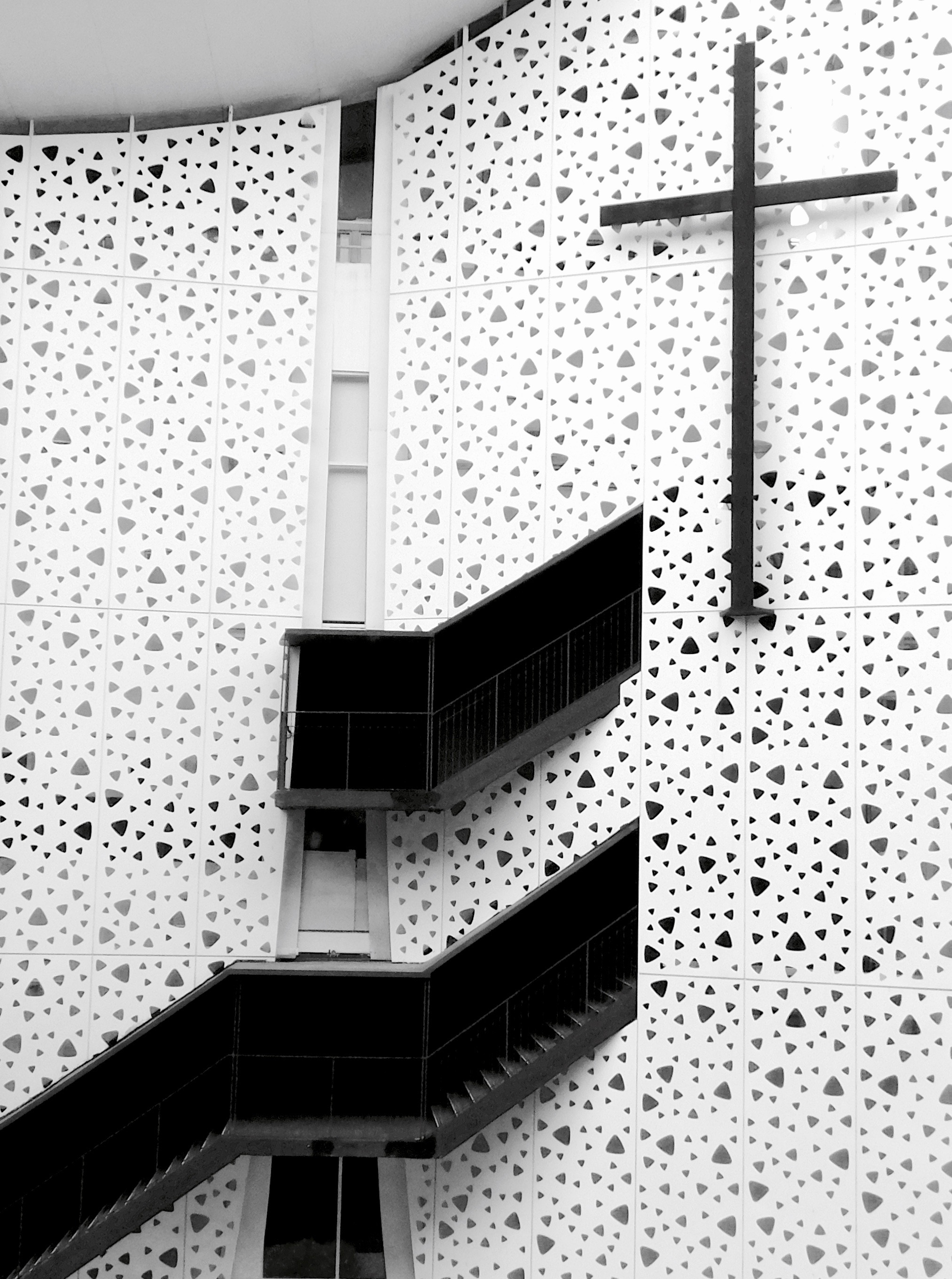
Singapore Life Church was founded in 1883. It underwent a third rebuilding in 2010. Its façade comprises three sections of perforated panels which are “sewn” together by external staircases which culminate in a large Cross.

Oriental Orthodox churches in Singapore include the old Armenian Church which has a church building and newly appointed resident clergy. By the Pontifical Order of Karekin II, Supreme Patriarch and Catholicos of All Armenians, Zaven Yazichyan, a member of the Brotherhood of Holy Etchmiadzin; has been appointed to serve as the spiritual pastor of Singapore, the Coptic Orthodox Church which meets in the Armenian Church, and the Syriac Orthodox Church; the latter two churches generally minister to the Coptic and Indian communities respectively.

There is also a large Malankara Orthodox presence in Singapore administering to the Keralite Diaspora, with services as St. Thomas Orthodox Syrian Cathedral.

=== Eastern Orthodoxy ===
In Singapore there is also a small but growing Eastern Orthodox congregation made up of ethnic Greeks, Georgians, Russians, Ukrainians and Indians, constituting a small minority in the local Christian population. In 2008, the Holy Synod of the Ecumenical Patriarchate of Constantinople decided to split the Eastern Orthodox Metropolitanate of Hong Kong and Southeast Asia (OMHKSEA) formed in 1996 into two, creating the Eastern Orthodox Metropolitanate of Singapore and South Asia, with jurisdiction over Singapore, Indonesia, Malaysia, Brunei, Timor, Maldives, Sri Lanka, Bangladesh, India, Nepal, Bhutan, Pakistan and Afghanistan. First Diocesan Bishop was appointed in 2011, when Holy Synod of the Ecumenical Patriarchate elected Archimandrite Konstantinos (Tsilis) as the first Metropolitan of Singapore and South Asia. He was ordained by Ecumenical Patriarch Bartholomew I of Constantinople and resides in Singapore. The central parish in Singapore is served by Archimandrite Daniel Toyne.

On 28 December 2018, in response to the Ecumenical Patriarchate's actions in Ukraine, the Holy Synod of the Russian Orthodox Church decided to create "a Patriarchal Exarchate in Western Europe with the center in Paris", as well as "a Patriarchal Exarchate in South-East Asia [PESEA] with the center in Singapore." The "sphere of pastoral responsibility" of the PESEA is Singapore, Vietnam, Indonesia, Cambodia, North Korea, South Korea, Laos, Malaysia, Myanmar, the Philippines, and Thailand. It is centered around the Diocese of Singapore, which also includes parishes in Malaysia, Timor-Leste and Papua New Guinea.

=== Nontrinitarianism ===
There are also various nontrinitarian congregations in Singapore, such as the Church of Jesus Christ of Latter-day Saints (LDS, "Mormons") and the True Jesus Church. While these groups are recognised by the state, other groups have been subject to varying degrees of restriction, most notably the Jehovah's Witnesses (JW) and the Unification Church (UC, "Moonies"), who are deemed as cults.

== Education and schools ==
A Pew Center study about religion and education around the world in 2016, found that between the various Christian communities, Singapore outranks other nations in terms of Christians who obtain a university degree in institutions of higher education (67%).

=== Anglican schools ===
- Anglican High School
- Christ Church Secondary School
- Saint Andrew's Junior School
- Saint Andrew's Secondary School
- Saint Andrew's Junior College
- Saint Hilda's Primary School
- Saint Hilda's Secondary School
- Saint Margaret's Primary School
- Saint Margaret's Secondary School

=== Methodist schools ===
- Anglo-Chinese School (Junior)
- Anglo-Chinese School (Primary)
- Anglo-Chinese School (Barker Road)
- Anglo-Chinese School (Independent)
- Anglo-Chinese Junior College
- Anglo-Chinese School (International)
- Fairfield Methodist Primary School
- Fairfield Methodist Secondary School
- Geylang Methodist Primary School
- Geylang Methodist Secondary School
- Methodist Girls' School
- Paya Lebar Methodist Girls' School (Primary)
- Paya Lebar Methodist Girls' School (Secondary)

=== Presbyterian schools ===
- Kuo Chuan Presbyterian Primary School
- Kuo Chuan Presbyterian Secondary School
- Pei Hwa Presbyterian Primary School
- Presbyterian High School

=== Roman Catholic schools ===
- Assumption English School
- Assumption Pathway School
- Canossa Catholic Primary School
- Canossian Convent Kindergarten
- Canossian School for the Hearing-Impaired
- Catholic High School
- Catholic Junior College
- Catholic Kindergarten
- CHIJ Katong (Primary)
- CHIJ Katong Convent
- CHIJ Kellock Primary
- CHIJ Our Lady of Good Counsel
- CHIJ Our Lady Queen of Peace
- CHIJ Our Lady of the Nativity
- CHIJ Primary (Toa Payoh)
- CHIJ Saint Nicholas Girls' School
- CHIJ Saint Joseph's Convent
- CHIJ Saint Theresa's Convent
- CHIJ Secondary School (Toa Payoh)
- De La Salle School
- Good Shepherd Kindergarten
- Hai Sing Catholic School
- Holy Innocents' High School
- Holy Innocents' Primary School
- Magdalene's Kindergarten
- Maris Stella Kindergarten
- Maris Stella High School
- Marymount Convent School
- Montfort Junior School
- Montfort Secondary School
- Nazareth Centre Kindergarten
- St Anthony's Canossian Primary School
- St Anthony's Canossian Secondary School
- St Anthony's Primary School
- St Gabriel's Primary School
- St Gabriel's Secondary School
- Saint Joseph's Institution
- Saint Joseph's Institution Junior
- Saint Joseph's Institution International School
- Saint Patrick's School

== Inter-faith ==
Singapore is a society of diverse religious traditions. The Declaration of Religious Harmony, which was published in 2003, is a seminal document, which the National Council of Churches of Singapore supported and helped create. On 3 September 2008, the sociologist and Pentecostal pastor, Mathew Mathews, who was named a visiting fellow of the Sociology department at the National University of Singapore, interviewed 183 Singaporean clergy. From these interviews he formed the opinion that the Christian clergy in many parts of Singapore were wary of inter-faith dialogue. He claimed that nearly 50% of clergy believe that inter-faith dialogue compromises their own religious convictions. He presented his paper to the Institute of Public Studies (Singapore) in a forum they organised on 2 September 2008.

== See also ==
- Religion in Singapore
- Megachurch
- Christianity
