= List of religious leaders convicted of crimes =

This is a list of religious leaders who have been convicted of serious crimes before, during or after their period as a religious leader.

== Violent crimes ==
- Tony Alamo – Headed a Santa Clarita commune. Convicted of tax evasion in 1994 and then resided in a halfway house in Texarkana. In 2009, he was convicted of ten federal counts of taking minors across state lines for sex, and sentenced to 150 years in federal prison.
- Shoko Asahara – Founder of Aum Shinrikyo sentenced to death by hanging under Japanese law for involvement in the 1995 Sarin gas attack on the Tokyo subway.
- Wayne Bent (aka: Michael Travesser) – Founder of Lord Our Righteousness Church, sometimes called Strong City. Was convicted of one count of criminal sexual contact of a minor and two counts of contributing to the delinquency of a minor in 2008. He was sentenced to 18 years with eight years suspended.
- Graham Capill – former leader of Christian Heritage New Zealand. Sentenced to a nine-year imprisonment term in 2005 after multiple charges of child sexual abuse against girls younger than twelve.
- Matthew F. Hale – Former leader of Creativity Movement sentenced to a 40-year prison term for soliciting an undercover FBI informant to kill a federal judge.
- Ahmad Badreddin Hassoun – Grand Mufti of Syria from 2005 until 2021. Sentenced to life imprisonment following the fall of the Assad regime for crimes including "inciting civil war and sectarian strife", incitement to murder and abuse of office.
- Warren Jeffs – Once President of Fundamentalist Church of Jesus Christ of Latter Day Saints (a polygamist Mormon sect), convicted of rape as an accomplice (overturned in 2010). Jeffs was convicted in a Texas state court of child sex charges and sentenced to life plus 20 years. He is incarcerated at the Powledge state prison. He also awaits trial in other states and in the federal court system.
- Jung Myung-seok – South Korean religious sect leader and founder of Providence. Convicted for raping several of his followers.
- William Kamm – An Australian religious sect leader who was sentenced to prison in October 2005 for a string of sexual attacks on a 15-year-old girl. In August 2007 his sentence was increased after being found guilty for a series of sexual abuses against another teenage girl over a five-year period.
- Ervil LeBaron – Led a small sect of polygamous Mormon fundamentalists, and was convicted of involvement in the murder of two people and plotting to kill another person in 1981.
- Alice Lenshina – Zambian head and founder of the Lumpa Church. Conflicts with the government over the sect's rejection of taxes led to a violent confrontation and her subsequent imprisonment.
- Jeffrey Lundgren – Headed splinter group from Reorganized Church of Jesus Christ of Latter Day Saints, executed on October 24, 2006, for multiple murders.
- Charles Manson – Leader of the Manson Family who served life in prison for first-degree murder until his death in 2017.
- Shukri Mustafa – Egyptian leader of Takfir wal-Hijra who was captured and executed on March 19, 1978, for the kidnapping and murder of an Egyptian ex-government minister.
- Fred Phelps – Leader of anti-gay Westboro Baptist Church. Convicted for disorderly conduct and battery.
- Swami Premananda – Indian religious leader convicted and sentenced to two life sentences for the rape of 13 girls and murder in 2005.
- Theodore Rinaldo – Leader of a religious group in Snohomish, Washington convicted of third-degree statutory rape for having sexual intercourse with one minor girl and of taking indecent liberties with another.
- Keith Raniere – The founder of NXIVM, a multi-level marketing company and cult based near Albany, New York. Raniere was convicted of racketeering on the charges of sex trafficking, sexual exploitation of a child, attempted sex trafficking, identity theft, forced labor, conspiracy to alter records, conspiracy of sex trafficking, forced labor, racketeering, and wire fraud. Raniere was sentenced to 120 years in federal prison starting in January 2021.
- Gurmeet Ram Rahim Singh – an Indian guru, music producer, singer-songwriter, actor, and filmmaker. He has been the head of the social group Dera Sacha Sauda since 1990. On 28 August 2017, Singh was sentenced to 20 years in jail for rape. He has also faced prosecution for murder and ordering forced castrations. He is also alleged to have committed sexual assaults on many of his followers. He is also alleged to be involved in the murder of a journalist
- Flordelis dos Santos de Souza – Brazilian former Pentecostal pastor, gospel singer and politician. In 2022, she was convicted of murder of her husband, Anderson do Carmo.
- Paul Schäfer – Former head of Chile-based Colonia Dignidad, was convicted of sexually abusing 25 children.
- Joseph Smith, Jr. – The founder of the Latter Day Saint movement, was "subjected to approximately thirty criminal actions" during his life. Another source reports Smith was arrested at least 42 times. A year after committing assault and battery on a local official, Smith was killed by a mob while in jail awaiting trial on charges of treason against Illinois.
- Roch Thériault – Former head of "Ant Hill Kids commune" served a life sentence in Canada for the murder of Solange Boislard.
- Yahweh ben Yahweh – Head of Nation of Yahweh, convicted for Federal racketeering charges and conspiracy involving 14 murders.
- Dwight York – Head of Nuwaubianism, convicted in 2004 of multiple RICO, child molestation, and financial reporting charges and sentenced to 135 years in prison.

== Non-violent crimes ==
- Jim Bakker – Created the PTL (Praise the Lord) organization. Convicted of fraud and conspiracy charges after illegally soliciting millions of dollars from his followers.
- David Yonggi Cho – Founder of Yoido Full Gospel Church. Sentenced to three years in prison in 2014 for embezzling 13 billion won (US$12 million) in church funds.
- Joseph Di Mambro – A founder of the Order of the Solar Temple. Several years prior to founding the group, he was convicted of fraud, impersonating a psychiatrist, and writing bad checks.
- William R. Ferguson – Founder of the Cosmic Circle of Fellowship. Prior to the founding of the group, he was sentenced to two years in prison for selling a quack healing device called the "Zerret Applicator".
- Hogen Fukunaga – Founder of Ho No Hana who was given a twelve-year jail sentence for fraudulently gaining 150 million yen from his followers.
- Kent Hovind (Dr. Dino) – founder of the Creation Science Evangelism ministry. Willful failure to collect, account for, and pay over Federal income taxes, knowingly structuring transactions in Federally insured financial institutions to evade the reporting requirements, and obstructing and impeding the administration of the internal revenue laws.
- L. Ron Hubbard – Founder of Scientology. He was convicted of petty theft and ordered to pay a $25 fine in San Luis Obispo, California, in 1948 and in 1978 was convicted of illegal business practices, namely, making false claims about his ability to cure physical illnesses in France. He was sentenced in absentia to four years in prison, which was never served.
- Luc Jouret – A founder of the Order of the Solar Temple. He was convicted in Canadian Federal Court of conspiring to buy illegal handguns.
- Kong Hee – Founder of City Harvest Church. Original sentence of eight years, reduced to three and a half years for misappropriation of church funds amounting to SGD50million, in 2016. See City Harvest Church Criminal Breach of Trust Case
- Henry Lyons – Former president of National Baptist Convention, USA, Inc. Convicted for racketeering and grand theft.
- Barry Minkow – Head pastor of San Diego's Community Bible Church, and founder of the Fraud Discovery Institute, who had turned to religion and entered the ministry after release from prison for the notorious ZZZZ Best fraud, returned to prison in 2011 for further acts of securities fraud while serving as a clergyman.
- Sun Myung Moon – Leader of Unification Church, imprisoned for criminal tax fraud in the 1980s.
- Robert Morris – Founder and senior pastor of Texas megachurch Gateway Church from 2000–2024. In March 2025, he was indicted on five counts of lewd or indecent acts with a child. In October 2025 he pleaded guilty to all five charges.
- Arnaud Mussy – Leader of Néo-Phare. Convicted of the French offense of "abuse of weakness" of his followers, and the group was forcibly dissolved.
- Julien Origas – Founder of the Renewed Order of the Temple. Several decades before founding the group, he was sentenced to four years in prison for collaborating with the Nazi occupation of France.
- Rajneesh – later called Osho. Fined $400,000 and given a 10-year suspended sentence following a plea bargain agreement in which he made an Alford plea to (1) a charge of having concealed his intent to remain permanently in the U.S. at the time he applied for his visa extension and (2) a charge of having conspired to have followers stay illegally in the country by having them enter into sham marriages. Deported from the United States.

== See also ==
- Mormon abuse cases
- Religious terrorism
- Religious violence
