= FOP =

Fop is a pejorative term for a foolish man.

FOP or fop may also refer to:

== Science and technology ==
- Feature-oriented positioning, in scanning microscopy
- Feature-oriented programming, in computer science, software product lines
- Fibrodysplasia ossificans progressiva, a connective tissue disease which can result in muscles fusing into bone
- Formatting Objects Processor, a Java application
- fop herbicides, the aryloxyphenoxypropionate subtype of ACCase inhibitors

== Other uses ==
- The Fairly OddParents, an American television series
- Fellowship of Presbyterians, now The Fellowship Community, a Christian movement in the United States
- Festival of Praise, a music festival in Singapore
- Flowery orange pekoe, a grade of tea leaf
- Fop Smit (1777–1866), Dutch naval architect and shipbuilder
- Fraternal Order of Police, an American police organization
- Fred. Olsen Production, a Norwegian gas and oil company
- Freedom of panorama, a concept in copyright law
- Morris Army Airfield, in Georgia, United States
- FOP grade tea
- Federation of Planets, from Star Trek
- FOP (Ukrainian: Фізична особа-підприємець), a type of legal entity in Ukraine
