= Charities Act 1994 =

Statute of the Parliament of Singapore

Charities Act
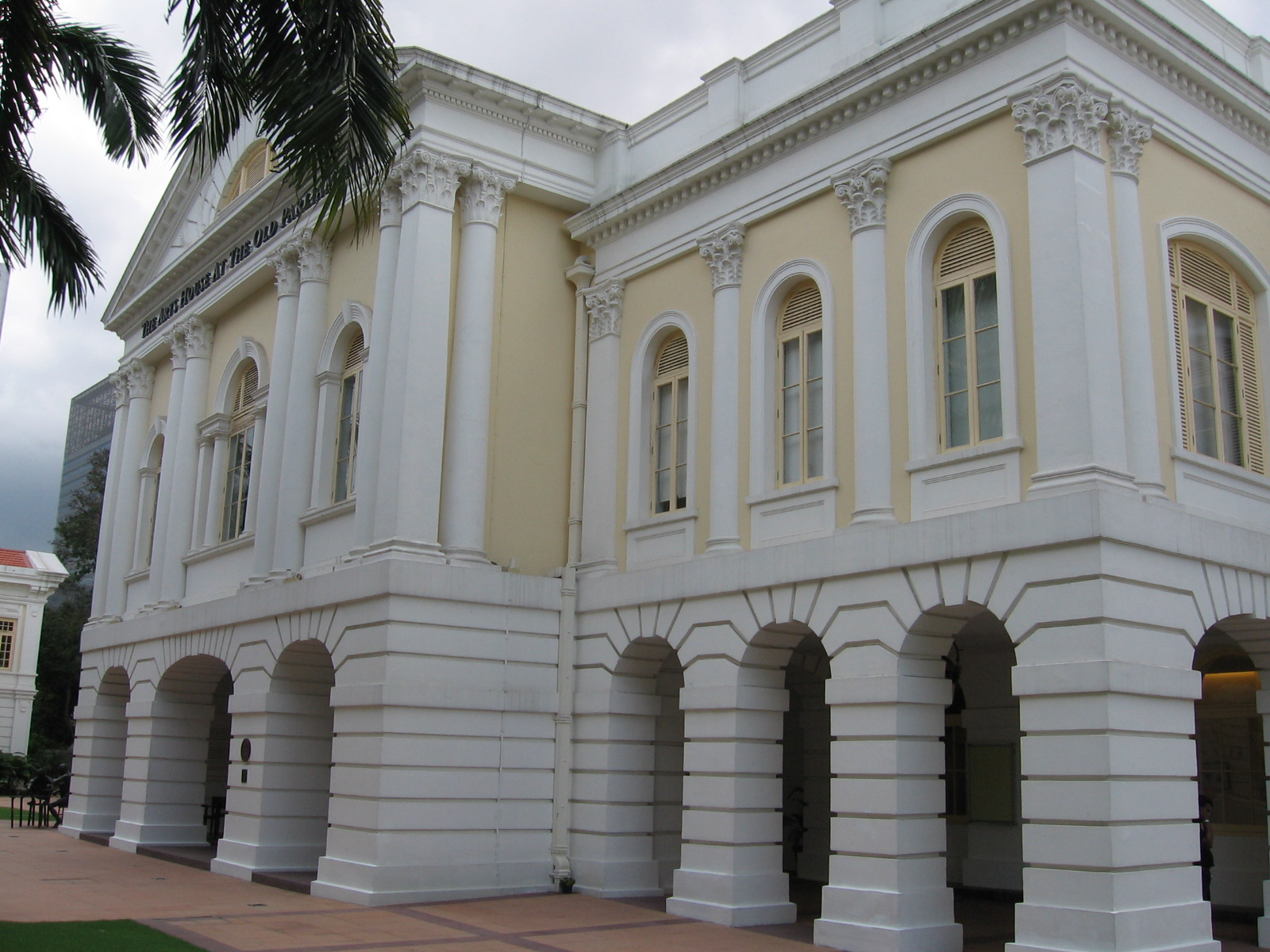
- Old Parliament House, photographed in January 2006

Parliament of Singapore
- Long title: An Act to make provision for the registration of charities, the administration of charities and their affairs, the regulation of charities and institutions of a public character, the regulation of fund-raising activities carried on in connection with charities and other institutions and the conduct of fund-raising appeals, and for purposes connected therewith.
- Enacted by: Parliament of Singapore
- Enacted: 1 January 1995
- Status: In force

The Charities Act is a Singapore statute which provides for the registration of charities, the administration of charities and their affairs, the regulation of charities and institutions of a public character, the regulation of fund-raising activities carried on in connection with charities and other institutions and the conduct of fund-raising appeals, and for purposes connected therewith. The Act, which was passed on 1 January 1995, empowers the Commissioner of Charities and Charity Council in overseeing the management and regulation of non-profits on the island.

== Overview ==
The Charities Act outlines the rules on governance of non-profits such as:

- Registration
- Deregistration
- Submission of accounts, reports, and other returns
- Fund-raising

Apart from overseeing the functions of charities in Singapore, under Section 27 of the Charities Act, those convicted of offences involving dishonesty or deception are automatically disqualified from being a governing board member, key officer or trustee.

== Uses of the Act ==
Corruption in Singapore particularly in non-profits are generally low. However, during the national crackdown in 2007, seven religious groups such as Kong Meng San Phor Kark See Monastery and Kwan Im Thong Hood Cho Temple were ordered by the Commissioner of Charities (COC) to open their books to auditors. On 31 May 2010, the Office of the COC and the Commercial Affairs Department (CAD) of the Singapore Police Force announced that 17 individuals linked to the City Harvest Church, including church founder Pastor Kong Hee and his deputy, Pastor Tan Ye Peng, were under investigation after complaints alleging the misuse of church funds. In the ongoing investigations and court lawsuits that took several years, six accused were found guilty of all criminal breach of trust charges pertaining to 409 read with section 109 of the Penal Code, Chapter 224. Falsification of Accounts under section 477A of the Penal Code, Chapter 224.
