= OFG =

OFG may refer to:

- Orofacial granulomatosis, an inflammatory condition of the lips and/or face
- OFG Bancorp, the financial holding company for Oriental Bank in Puerto Rico
- Oxford Falls Grammar School, in Sydney, New South Wales, Australia
