= Oxford Falls Grammar School =

Oxford Falls Grammar

Location
- Oxford Falls, Northern Beaches; Sydney, New South Wales; Australia; 33°44′17″S 151°14′48″E

Information
- Type: Independent co-educational early learning, primary and secondary day school
- Motto: For Greatness. For Excellence. For Christ.
- Religious affiliation: C3 Church Global
- Denomination: Non-denominational Pentecostal Christianity
- Established: 1984; 42 years ago
- Founder: Phil Pringle
- Educational authority: NSW Department of Education
- Headmaster: Helen Finlay
- Years: K–12
- Enrolment: 1,300
- Area: 6 hectares (15 acres)
- Campus type: Outer suburban
- Colour
- Affiliations: Christian Schools Australia; Combined Independent Schools; Christian Schools Sports Association; Peninsula Independent Schools Association
- Website: ofgs.nsw.edu.au

Oxford Falls Grammar School (OFG) is an independent Christian co-educational primary and secondary school, located in Oxford Falls on the Northern Beaches of Sydney, New South Wales, Australia.

The school is set on 6 hectares (15 acres) of landscaped grounds and incorporate a four-stream infants school, three-stream primary school and a triple-stream senior school of approximately 1,300 students. The school is a member of Christian Schools Australia, the Christian Schools Sporting Association (CSSA) and is a member of the Combined Independent Schools (CIS).

The Principal of Oxford Falls Grammar School is Helen Finlay, who took up his post in 2026.

== History ==
The following individuals have served as Headmasters of the Oxford Falls Grammar:

| Ordinal | Officeholder | Term start | Term end |
|---|---|---|---|
| 1 | Andrew Egan | 1984 | 1997 |
| 2 | Barry Southwell | 1997 | 1998 |
| 3 | Gabi Korocz | 1998 | 2014 |
| 4 | Geoffrey Fouracre | 2014 | 2017 |
| 5 | Dr Peter Downey | 2017 | 2026 |
| 6 | Helen Finlay | 2026 | Present |

According to a webpage on their official site celebrating their 40th anniversary, the school was established in 1984 as Northside Christian School and operated as Wakehurst Christian School in the late 1980s before becoming "Oxford Falls Grammar School" in 1990.

== Facilities ==
Oxford Falls Grammar is set in a semi-rural suburb of Oxford Falls in Sydney's Northern Beaches. Facilities include two full-sized ovals, a small oval, an indoor gymnasium/basketball court, an outdoor basketball court, an indoor gym, a large auditorium, a large multi-purpose space, a state of the art theatre with retractable seating, and a Performing Arts Centre incorporating purpose-built Dance and Drama studios, music tuition rooms, a production studio, an acoustic music room, an electronic music studio, and a dedicated concert and stage band rehearsal room, a canteen and a café.

== Sport ==
Oxford Falls Grammar competes in many sports, including at state and national levels.

Sports teams at Oxford Falls Grammar include athletics, Australian rules football, basketball, cheerleading, cross country, diving, netball, rugby league, rugby sevens, rugby union, soccer, swimming, tennis, touch football, triathlon, and Ultimate frisbee.

Basketball is one of the main sports played in both the Junior and Senior schools. Teams have gone on to reach national levels, and have competed at events such as The National Christian Schools Basketball Championships. The school is well represented at local and state Rugby, Soccer and Netball gala days. Aussie rules is a popular sport in the Junior school and Oxford Falls Grammar is very successful in competitions; reaching the 2006 NSW Finals in the Paul Kelly Cup. The school competes in swimming, diving, athletics and cross country events at Metropolitan, CSSA State and CIS State levels. Swimmers have gone on past CSSA State level to the annual National Christian Schools Swimming Championships. In 2005, a number of students competed in the Pacific School Games and brought home a number of Gold medals.

PISA sport is also offered and includes Tee-ball, senior girls softball, senior boys cricket, boys and girls soccer, girls netball, boys rugby league (mod-league) and mixed AFL.

The School is a member of Combined Independent Schools (CIS) which allows a highly competitive pathway for individuals in a large array of sports.

== Notable alumni ==
- Charlotte Best – actress
- Jo Brigden-Jones, kayaker
- Chloe Dalton OAM – rugby union player and 2016 Olympic gold medallist
- Anneliese Rubie – sprinter and 2016 Rio Olympian
- Remy Siemsen – soccer player

== Notable staff ==
- Briony Scott

== See also ==
- List of non-government schools in New South Wales
