= Elim Church Singapore =

Church in Singapore

Elim Church (Singapore)
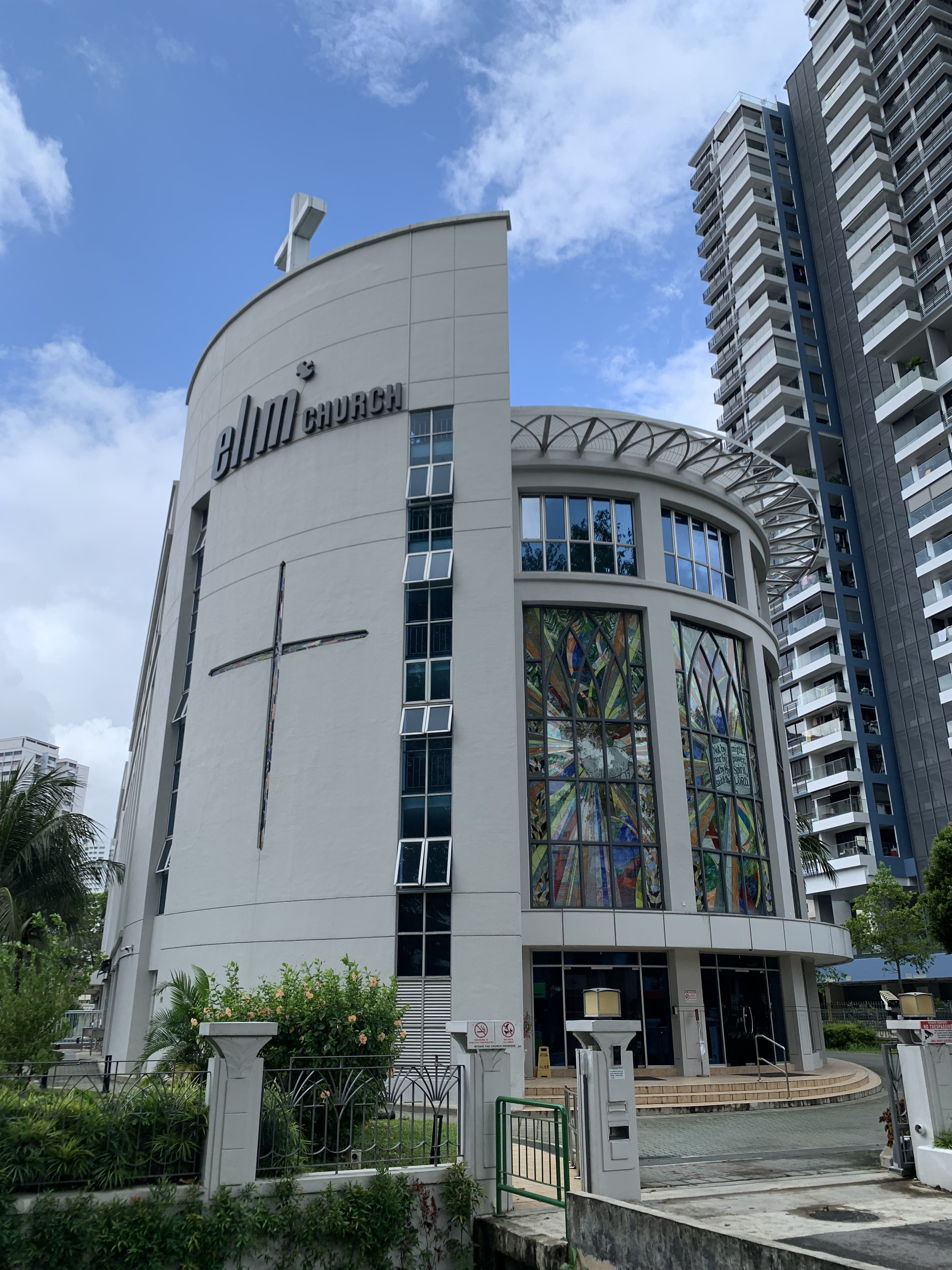
- Church view from Serangoon Road

- Location within Singapore
- 1.32378°N 103.86457°E
- Location: 1079 Serangoon Road; Singapore 328182
- Country: Singapore
- Denomination: Pentecostal
- Churchmanship: Pentecostal
- Website: www.elimchurch.org.sg

History
- Founded: 1928
- Dedication: Friday, 20 October 1939

Elim Church (Singapore) or Elim Church Assembly of God is one of the first Pentecostal churches to be established in Singapore. Founded in 1928, it is the first and oldest Assemblies of God church in the city-state.

The church is located at 1079 Serangoon Road. It is approximately 550 metres from Boon Keng MRT station.

The church represents a wide range of ages, cultures and backgrounds. It conducts several multi-lingual services on Sundays. All services involve lay participation.

== History ==
Elim Church began as a small gathering of Christians in 1928. It was pastored by Rev. Cecil and Mrs. Edith Jackson.

From Marah to Elim

And they came to Elim, where were twelve wells of water, and threescore and ten palm trees: and they encamped there by the waters.

— Exodus 15:27, KJV.

In 1937, the Jacksons were replaced by Rev. and Mrs. Lawrence McKinney. They embarked on a building project for a more permanent premise for the church. After months of prayer, a property at 1079 Serangoon Road was secured. It was a bungalow with a large compound, surrounded by an abundance of trees. Rev. McKinney named it Elim Church Assembly of God because it reminded him of the Israelites when they came to Elim after their exodus from Egypt. A dedication service for the new church was held on Friday, 20 October 1939.

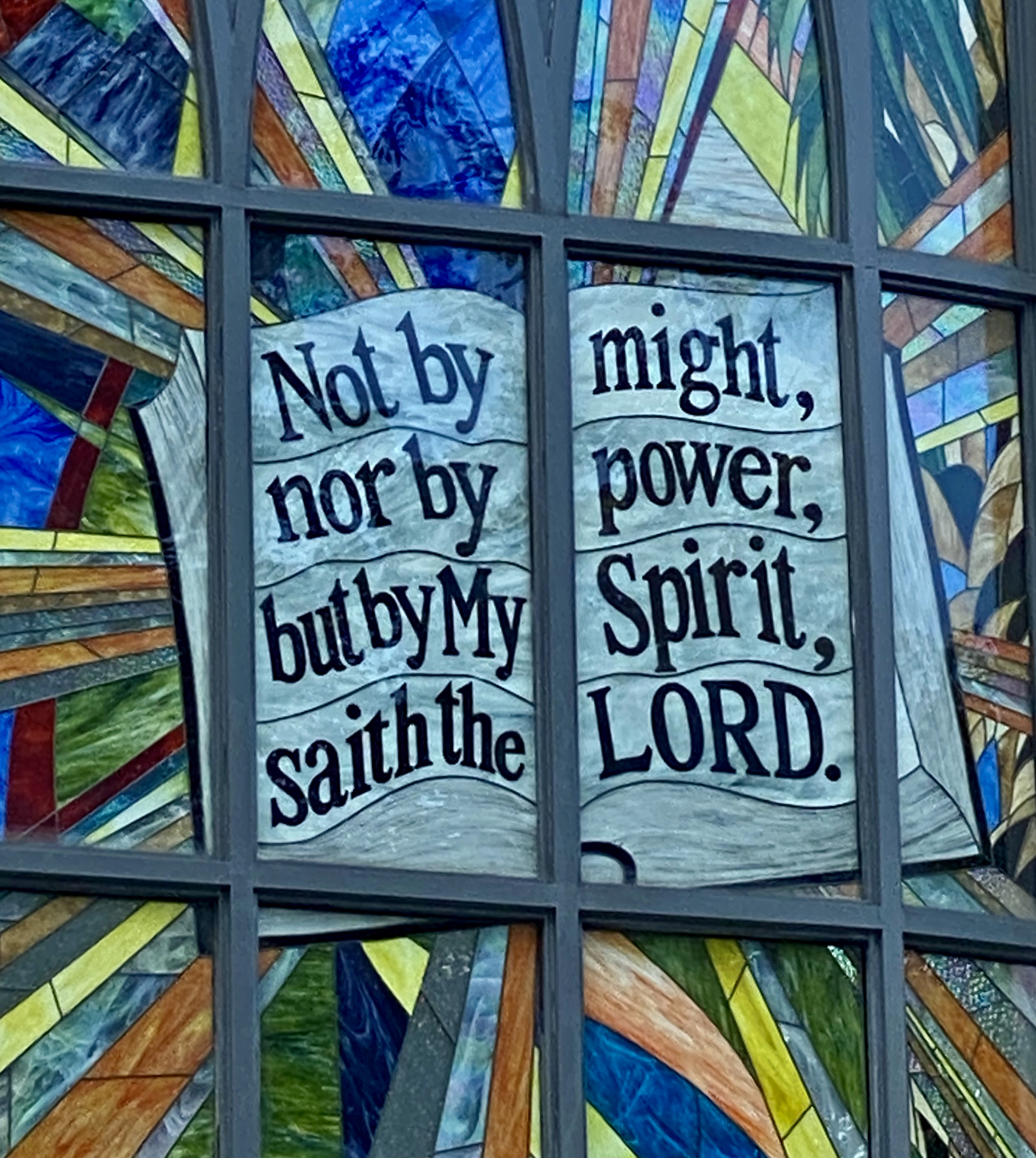
A biblical verse inscribed on a stained glass window above the church's entrance.

The church continued to grow until the outbreak of the Second World War (1942–1945). During the Japanese Occupation of Singapore, lay leaders were appointed by Rev. McKinney to manage the church. They were Lye Eng Hong, Victor Manny, Arthur P. Abeysekera and Yeo Bock Hoe.

After the war ended, the church came under the leadership of Rev. Alfred A. McGrew (1949–1953), Rev. R.B. and Mrs. Avalone Cavaness (1954–1966), Rev. David and Mrs. Betty Baker (1968–1969), Rev. Fred and Mrs. Rita Abeysekera (1969–1974), Rev. Cresmerio and Mrs. Norma Fernandez (1976–1987), and Rev. Dr. Fred and Margaret Seaward (1987–2006). On 1 July 2006, Rev. Glen Lim Cheng Huat took over as Senior Pastor of the church.

== See also ==
- Assemblies of God
- Christianity in Singapore
- Megachurch
- Pentecostalism
