= Oxford Falls =

- Suburb
- Interactive map of Oxford Falls
- Country: Australia
- State: New South Wales
- City: Sydney
- LGA: Northern Beaches Council
- Location: 20 km (12 mi) north-east of Sydney CBD
- Established: 1902

Government
  - State electorate: Wakehurst
  - Federal division: Mackellar
- Elevation: 77 m (253 ft)

Population
  - Total: 265 (2021 census)
- Postcode: 2100
Suburbs around Oxford Falls
Belrose	Belrose	Narrabeen
Frenchs Forest	Oxford Falls	Cromer
Frenchs Forest	Beacon Hill	Beacon Hill

Oxford Falls is a suburb of northern Sydney, in the state of New South Wales, Australia 20 kilometres north-east of the Sydney central business district in the local government area of Northern Beaches Council. Oxford Falls is part of the Northern Beaches region and also considered to be part of the Forest District, colloquially known as The Forest.

== History ==
Alexander Bowen was granted 200 acres (0.81 km^{2}) here in 1878, which he named Bloodwood Gully. Oxford Falls was gazetted as the name of the suburb in 1902. Wakehurst Parkway is named after John de Vere Loder, 2nd Baron Wakehurst, the Governor of New South Wales (1937–1946).

Oxford Falls Post Office opened on 2 January 1924 and closed in 1984.

== Landmarks ==
The Oxford Falls are two waterfalls on Middle Creek, which flows north to meet Oxford Creek. Meandering Creek flows into Middle Creek. Wheeler Creek forms part of the border with Cromer. Garigal National Park borders the suburb, to the north.

== Commercial areas ==
- Reclaimed Building Material Yard on Meatworks Road

== Schools and churches ==
- Oxford Falls Grammar School
- St Pius X College
- Christian City Church, Oxford Falls

== Sport and recreation ==
Oxford Falls has a number of trails suitable for mountain bike riding including downhill and free-ride trails.

- Oxford Falls Peace Park
- St Pius X College Playing Fields
- Australian Tennis Academy
- Warringah Radio Control Society flying field
