= Feature-oriented scanning =

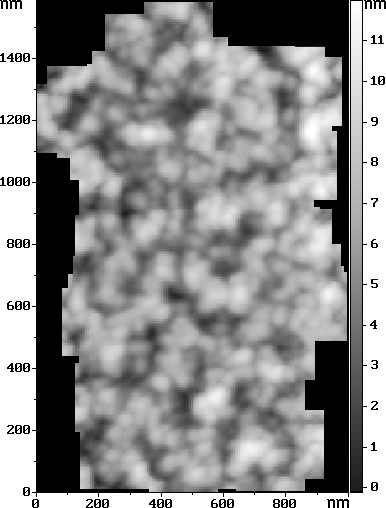
Image of carbon film surface obtained by FOS method (AFM, tapping mode). Carbon clusters (hills) and intercluster spaces (pits) are used as surface features.

Feature-oriented scanning (FOS) is a method of precision measurement of surface topography with a scanning probe microscope in which surface features (objects) are used as reference points for microscope probe attachment. With FOS method, by passing from one surface feature to another located nearby, the relative distance between the features and the feature neighborhood topographies are measured. This approach allows to scan an intended area of a surface by parts and then reconstruct the whole image from the obtained fragments. Beside the mentioned, it is acceptable to use another name for the method – object-oriented scanning (OOS).

== Topography ==
Any topography element that looks like a hill or a pit in wide sense may be taken as a surface feature. Examples of surface features (objects) are: atoms, interstices, molecules, grains, nanoparticles, clusters, crystallites, quantum dots, nanoislets, pillars, pores, short nanowires, short nanorods, short nanotubes, viruses, bacteria, organelles, cells, etc.

FOS is designed for high-precision measurement of surface topography (see Fig.) as well as other surface properties and characteristics. Moreover, in comparison with the conventional scanning, FOS allows obtaining a higher spatial resolution. Thanks to a number of techniques embedded in FOS, the distortions caused by thermal drifts and creeps are practically eliminated.

== Applications ==
FOS has the following fields of application: surface metrology, precise probe positioning, automatic surface characterization, automatic surface modification/stimulation, automatic manipulation of nanoobjects, nanotechnological processes of “bottom-up” assembly, coordinated control of analytical and technological probes in multiprobe instruments, control of atomic/molecular assemblers, control of probe nanolithographs, etc.

== See also ==
- Counter-scanning
- Feature-oriented positioning
