= Festival of Praise =

Festival of Praise (FOP) is a Christian Praise and Worship concert started in 1986, attended by various churches in Singapore and Malaysia. It is held annually at the Singapore Indoor Stadium.

== Committee ==
- Founder/ Chairman Emeritus: Rev. Dr. Canon James Wong
- Chairman: Rev. Yang Tuck Yoong
- Vice-Chairman: Ps. Simon Chua
- Treasurer: Mr. Danny Koh
- Secretary: Ps. Kevin Koh

== Notable Attendees ==
- 1999 Rev. David Yonggi Cho
- 2003 Tommy Walker
- 2005 Delirious?, Hillsong
- 2006 Rev. Dr. Ed Silvoso, Don Moen, Christian City Church
- 2007 Rev. Dr. Phil Pringle, Don Moen, Delirious?
- 2008 Rev. Mark Conner, Reuben Morgan, The Parachute Band
- 2009 Rev. Mark Conner, Bob Fitts, True Worshippers
- 2010 Planetshakers, Rev. Dr. Che Ahn, Don Moen
- 2011 John Bevere, New Life Band, Andrew Yeo
- 2012 Cancelled
- 2013 Andy Elmes, Klaus, Andrew Yeo, Cheryl You
- 2014 Wayne Cordeiro, Tim Hughes, Nikki Fletcher, Andrew Yeo
- 2015 Jubilee Day of Prayer
