= Ho Yeow Sun =

Singaporean religious leader & pop singer

Reverend Ho Yeow Sun
- Native name: 何耀珊
- Church: City Harvest Church

Orders
- Ordination: 19 October 2015 by Michael Scales, Nyack College

Personal details
- Born: 2 June 1972 (age 54) Singapore
- Denomination: Christianity
- Spouse: Kong Hee (m. 1992)
- Children: Dayan Kong
- Profession: Pastor, Singer
- Education: Anglican High School; Victoria Junior College

Reverend Ho Yeow Sun (Chinese: 何耀珊; pinyin: Hé Yàoshān), better known as Sun Ho, is a Singaporean Christian pastor and co-founder of City Harvest Church, and former Mandopop singer.

== Early life ==
Ho studied at Anglican High School and Victoria Junior College. Born in Singapore, she started as a pastor when she was 20 years old with her husband, Kong Hee, founding City Harvest Church. She later moved to Taiwan to pursue a career as a Mandopop singer.

== Career ==
Ho is one of the co-founders of City Harvest Church and its community services and is married to Kong Hee. Ho also led City Harvest Church's Creative Department from 1992 until late 2000, when she resigned and relocated to Taiwan, where she would do most of her recordings, to pursue her singing career. At the beginning of her music career, she faced accusations that her dressing and song lyrics were sexually charged and inappropriate for her religious background, and rumours of her using her church's support to aid in album sales. After a series of concerts, she had the opportunity to further develop her career outside of Singapore, focusing on China, Taiwan and the US.

External videos
- China Wine, Music video by Wyclef Jean
- Mr Bill, Music video by Wyclef Jean
- Fancy Free, Sun Ho's last music video before return to Singapore

From 2002 to 2007, Ho, based in Taiwan, released a succession of five Mandarin pop albums through Warner Music Taiwan, that have either reached double or triple platinum status. During this five-year period, Ho worked with composers such as Ma Yufen (马毓芬), the late Ma Zhaojun (马兆骏) F.I.R., Milk, Arys Chien (深白色), Lee Wei Song (李伟菘), and Tan Han Jin (陈奂仁). "Lonely Travel" was ranked No. 1 on nine top music charts. Her next album "Gain" released in 2006 reached No. 1 position on 10 top music charts. In 2007, Ho released "Embrace" which hit No. 1 on 11 top music charts. Her song, "Starting Point", was used as theme song for Singapore TV series "Turning Point" based on real-life inspirational stories, of which Ho was the host.

In 2003, Ho released her debut American single "Where Did Love Go," produced by David Foster and Peter Rafelson. The song reached No. 1 on the Billboard's Hot Dance Club Play "Breakout" Chart in December 2003. Three of her subsequent singles, "One With You", "Without Love" and "Gone" reached No. 1 positions on the Billboard Dance Chart. "Ends Of The Earth" also joined the abovementioned three singles to reach No. 1 positions on the UK MusicWeek Chart. Her other singles also include "China Wine" and "Mr. Bill", both produced by Wyclef Jean of the rap group The Fugees. Ho also worked with other top industry personalities such as Diane Warren, David Foster, Jimmy Harry, Tony Moran, Chris Cox, Eric Kupper, Jason Nevins, Moto Blanco and the Underdogs.

Ho returned to Singapore from 2010 and resumed her pastoral duties at City Harvest Church. In 2015, she was ordained and given the title Reverend and the position of the Executive Pastor. In 2018, she co-founded The Harvest Network (THN) together with Rev Dr Bobby Chaw to help City Harvest Church to connect to other like-minded Churches around the region.

== Awards ==
On 6 November 2003, Ho was among 10 international nominees to be presented "The Outstanding Young Person of the World 2003" Award for her social work in Asia. The ceremony was held in Copenhagen, Denmark, under the auspices of Junior Chamber International. Ho is the fourth Asian celebrity to receive the award after Jacky Cheung, Andy Lau and Michelle Yeoh.

== Controversy ==
In 2010, Ho was questioned by the Government of Singapore when City Harvest Church came under investigation for alleged misuse of funds.

After the City Harvest Church trial began which created an extended scrutiny of Ho's singing career, two suspension orders were imposed against her where "Ms Ho is not involved even though she is a direct beneficiary". She resumed her role as the executive director of the church in Singapore after they were lifted in May 2013 by the Commissioner of Charities (COC).

On 19 October 2015, two days before the sentencing of her husband Kong Hee, Ho was ordained by Michael Scales from Nyack College.

Two days later, all six City Harvest Church leaders were sentenced to between 21 months and eight years' jail on Friday (20 November) for misappropriating S$50 million of church funds as well as criminal breach of trust, and falsification of accounts. Ho's husband, senior pastor Kong Hee, the founder of the church, was sentenced to eight years' imprisonment for criminal breach of trust.

The November 2016 appeal revealed the City Harvest Church leaders spent $24 million on Ho's musical foray into the United States which included a house in Hollywood that cost $28,000 a month in rent; a whole entourage of staff; a $1.9 million paycheck to rapper Wyclef Jean to produce the "China Wine" video; as well as another $500,000 to sweep up her albums when they tanked.

External videos
- Law minister K Shanmugam setting out the government's position on the court's ruling, Gov.sg video

Over the course of the trial, the court heard that Kong Hee had set up a multi-purpose account where church members deposited "love gifts" that were used to pay for expenses between 2006 and 2010. Examples of expenses included more than $300,000 spent on travel, more than $100,000 on food, and over $100,000 on make-up and medical costs. Ho's earnings of more than $400,000 a year came from these gifts, and Kong admitted in court that donors were unaware of Ho's earnings. The 2012 Commissioner of Charities (COC) inquiry found that $3 million was purportedly spent by Ho from the MPA between April 2007 and March 2010. Givers to the account were not told the Crossover project was in fact funded by illegal bonds and were persuaded to give towards the project's costs. Besides Sun's 'salary' from the account of $400,000/year, Sun was receiving an official salary from Xtron at US$10,000/mth and entitled to 25% of project gross income, regardless and before costs.

== Personal life ==
Together with husband Kong Hee, Ho has one son, Dayan Kong, who was born in 2005.

Ho formerly lived in a 5,242 sq ft duplex penthouse located on the 11th floor of The Oceanfront in the premium residential enclave Sentosa Cove. The penthouse was co-owned by her husband with Indonesian tycoon Wahju Hanafi, a church follower. The pair bought the penthouse for $9.33 million in 2007, each paying monthly installments of $17,000, before the apartment was sold at a loss of over S$2 million to a Kenyan diplomat.

== Discography ==
=== Albums ===
- Sun With Love (2002)
- Sun*day (2002)
- Lonely Travel (2003)
- Gain (2006)
- Embrace (2007)
- Cause A Ruckus (Unreleased) (2009)

=== Singles ===
- Where Did Love Go (2003)
- One With You (2004)
- Ends Of The Earth (2005)
- Without You (2005)
- Gone (2006)
- China Wine (as Sun AKA Geisha) (2007)
- Mr. Bill (as Sun AKA Geisha) (2008)
- Fancy Free (2009)
