= List of primary schools in Singapore =

This is a list of primary schools in Singapore. Children typically start their primary education in the year they turn seven. Primary education lasts six years, and is compulsory for all Singapore citizens.

Primary schools in Singapore are either classified as Government or Government-aided schools. Primary schools are typically mixed-sex, though there are a number of single-sex schools. Some primary schools are affiliated with a secondary school, and such schools have a lower requirement for students from the primary section to enter the affiliated secondary school. At the end of the six years in primary school, students sit for the Primary School Leaving Examination (PSLE). The Ministry of Education (MOE) places some primary schools under the Special Assistance Plan (SAP), which specially emphasises education of the Chinese language and culture.

Name	Funding	Type	Town	Notes	School code
Admiralty Primary School	Government	Mixed	Woodlands		1744
Ahmad Ibrahim Primary School	Government	Mixed	Yishun		1738
Ai Tong School	Government-aided, SAP	Mixed	Bishan	Affiliated to Singapore Hokkien Huay Kuan (SHHK)	5625
Alexandra Primary School	Government	Mixed	Bukit Merah		1266
Anchor Green Primary School	Government	Mixed	Sengkang		1254
Anderson Primary School	Government	Mixed	Ang Mo Kio		1766
Ang Mo Kio Primary School	Government	Mixed	Ang Mo Kio		1150
Anglo-Chinese School (Junior)	Government-aided	Boys	Central		5001
Anglo-Chinese School (Primary)	Government-aided	Mixed	Tengah		5638
Angsana Primary School	Government	Mixed	Tampines		1268
Bedok Green Primary School	Government	Mixed	Bedok		1230
Bendemeer Primary School	Government	Mixed	Kallang	Merged with Balestier Hill Primary School in 2019	1129
Blangah Rise Primary School	Government	Mixed	Bukit Merah		1145
Boon Lay Garden Primary School	Government	Mixed	Jurong West		1640
Bukit Panjang Primary School	Government	Mixed	Bukit Panjang		1020
Bukit Timah Primary School	Government	Mixed	Bukit Timah		1247
Bukit View Primary School	Government	Mixed	Bukit Batok		1209
Beacon Primary School	Government	Mixed	Bukit Panjang	Awaiting relocation plans	1249
Canberra Primary School	Government	Mixed	Sembawang		1751
Canossa Catholic Primary School	Government-aided	Mixed	Geylang		5003
Cantonment Primary School	Government	Mixed	Bukit Merah		1256
Casuarina Primary School	Government	Mixed	Pasir Ris	Merged with Loyang Primary School in 2019	1771
Catholic High School (primary section)	Government-aided, SAP	Boys	Bishan		7102
Cedar Primary School	Government	Mixed	Toa Payoh	Merged with MacPherson Primary School in 2019	1211
Changkat Primary School	Government	Mixed	Tampines		1239
CHIJ (Katong) Primary	Government-aided	Girls	Katong	Affiliated to CHIJ (Katong) Convent	5637
CHIJ (Kellock)	Government-aided	Girls	Bukit Merah		5005
CHIJ Our Lady of Good Counsel	Government-aided	Girls	Serangoon		5017
CHIJ Our Lady of the Nativity	Government-aided	Girls	Hougang		5007
CHIJ Our Lady Queen of Peace	Government-aided	Girls	Bukit Panjang		5019
CHIJ Primary	Government-aided	Girls	Toa Payoh		5004
CHIJ Saint Nicholas Girls' School (primary section)	Government-aided, SAP	Girls	Ang Mo Kio		7118
Chongfu School	Government-aided	Mixed	Yishun	Affiliated to SHHK	5636
Chongzheng Primary School	Government	Mixed	Tampines		1203
Chua Chu Kang Primary School	Government	Mixed	Chua Chu Kang		1244
Clementi Primary School	Government	Mixed	Clementi		1772
Compassvale Primary School	Government	Mixed	Sengkang		1757
Concord Primary School	Government	Mixed	Chua Chu Kang		1760
Corporation Primary School	Government	Mixed	Jurong West	Awaiting relocation plans	1132
Damai Primary School	Government	Mixed	Tampines		1102
Dazhong Primary School	Government	Mixed	Bukit Batok		1229
De La Salle School	Government-aided	Mixed	Chua Chu Kang	Lasallian school, founded in 1952.	5008
East Spring Primary School	Government	Mixed	Tampines		1755
Edgefield Primary School	Government	Mixed	Punggol	Awaiting relocation plans	1769
Elias Park Primary School	Government	Mixed	Pasir Ris		1737
Endeavour Primary School	Government	Mixed	Sembawang		1252
Evergreen Primary School	Government	Mixed	Woodlands		1756
Fairfield Methodist School (Primary)	Government-aided	Mixed	Dover		5020
Farrer Park Primary School	Government	Mixed	Kallang	Merged with Stamford Primary School in 2023	1246
Fengshan Primary School	Government	Mixed	Bedok		1657
Fernvale Primary School	Government	Mixed	Sengkang		1177
First Toa Payoh Primary School	Government	Mixed	Toa Payoh		1610
Frontier Primary School	Government	Mixed	Jurong West		1257
Fuchun Primary School	Government	Mixed	Woodlands		1208
Fuhua Primary School	Government	Mixed	Jurong East		1107
Gan Eng Seng Primary School	Government	Mixed	Bukit Merah		1221
Geylang Methodist School (Primary)	Government-aided	Mixed	Geylang		5022
Gongshang Primary School	Government	Mixed	Tampines		1222
Greendale Primary School	Government	Mixed	Punggol		1251
Greenridge Primary School	Government	Mixed	Bukit Panjang	Awaiting relocation plans	1245
Greenwood Primary School	Government	Mixed	Woodlands		1765
Haig Girls' School	Government	Girls	Geylang		1038
Henry Park Primary School	Government-aided	Mixed	Bukit Timah		1221
Holy Innocents' Primary School	Government-aided, SAP	Mixed	Hougang		5634
Hong Wen School	Government-aided, SAP	Mixed	Kallang		5626
Horizon Primary School	Government	Mixed	Punggol		1255
Hougang Primary School	Government	Mixed	Hougang		1763
Huamin Primary School	Government	Mixed	Yishun		1223
Innova Primary School	Government	Mixed	Woodlands		1250
Jiemin Primary School	Government	Mixed	Yishun		1207
Jing Shan Primary School	Government	Mixed	Ang Mo Kio	Merged with Da Qiao Primary School in 2019	1166
Junyuan Primary School	Government	Mixed	Tampines		1727
Jurong Primary School	Government	Mixed	Jurong East		1045
Jurong West Primary School	Government	Mixed	Jurong West		1753
Keming Primary School	Government	Mixed	Bukit Batok		1238
Kheng Cheng School	Government-aided	Mixed	Toa Payoh		5608
Kong Hwa School	Government-aided, SAP	Mixed	Geylang	Affiliated to SHHK	5168
Kranji Primary School	Government	Mixed	Chua Chu Kang		1745
Kuo Chuan Presbyterian Primary School	Government-aided	Mixed	Bishan		5024
Lakeside Primary School	Government	Mixed	Jurong West		1248
Lianhua Primary School	Government	Mixed	Bukit Batok		1232
Maha Bodhi School	Government-aided, SAP	Mixed	Geylang		5601
Maris Stella High School (primary section)	Government-aided, SAP	Mixed	Toa Payoh		7111
Marsiling Primary School	Government	Mixed	Woodlands		1645
Marymount Convent School	Government-aided	Girls	Toa Payoh		7301
Mayflower Primary School	Government	Mixed	Ang Mo Kio		1151
Mee Toh School	Government-aided	Mixed	Punggol		5183
Meridian Primary School	Government	Mixed	Pasir Ris		1764
Methodist Girls' School (Primary)	Government-aided	Girls	Bukit Timah		5027
Montfort Junior School	Government-aided	Mixed	Hougang	Montfortian-Gabrielite school	5018
Nan Chiau Primary School	Government-aided	Mixed	Sengkang	Affiliated to SHHK	5028
Nan Hua Primary School	Government-aided, SAP	Mixed	Clementi		5622
Nanyang Primary School	Government-aided, SAP	Mixed	Bukit Timah		5258
Naval Base Primary School	Government	Mixed	Yishun		1730
New Town Primary School	Government	Mixed	Queenstown		1621
Ngee Ann Primary School	Government-aided	Mixed	Marine Parade		5197
Northshore Primary School	Government	Mixed	Punggol		1274
North View Primary School	Government	Mixed	Yishun		1740
North Vista Primary School	Government	Mixed	Sengkang		1253
Northland Primary School	Government	Mixed	Yishun		1729
Northoaks Primary School	Government	Mixed	Sembawang		1267
Oasis Primary School	Government	Mixed	Punggol		1270
Opera Estate Primary School	Government	Mixed	Bedok		1212
Park View Primary School	Government	Mixed	Pasir Ris		1743
Pasir Ris Primary School	Government	Mixed	Pasir Ris		1243
Paya Lebar Methodist Girls' School (Primary)	Government-aided	Girls	Hougang		5635
Pei Chun Public School	Government-aided, SAP	Mixed	Toa Payoh		5602
Pei Hwa Presbyterian Primary School	Government-aided, SAP	Mixed	Bukit Timah		5623
Pei Tong Primary School	Government	Mixed	Clementi		1650
Peiying Primary School	Government	Mixed	Yishun		1236
Pioneer Primary School	Government	Mixed	Tengah		1741
Poi Ching School	Government-aided, SAP	Mixed	Tampines		5603
Princess Elizabeth Primary School	Government	Mixed	Bukit Batok		1228
Punggol Cove Primary School	Government	Mixed	Punggol		1269
Punggol Green Primary School	Government	Mixed	Punggol		1259
Punggol Primary School	Government	Mixed	Hougang		1742
Punggol View Primary School	Government	Mixed	Punggol		1260
Qifa Primary School	Government	Mixed	Clementi		1197
Qihua Primary School	Government	Mixed	Woodlands		1734
Queenstown Primary School	Government	Mixed	Queenstown		1071
Radin Mas Primary School	Government	Mixed	Bukit Merah		1072
Raffles Girls' Primary School	Government	Girls	Bukit Timah		1073
Red Swastika School	Government-aided, SAP	Mixed	Bedok		5214
River Valley Primary School	Government	Mixed	Central		1217
Riverside Primary School	Government	Mixed	Woodlands		1264
Rivervale Primary School	Government	Mixed	Sengkang		1752
Rosyth School	Government-aided	Mixed	Serangoon		1077
Rulang Primary School	Government	Mixed	Jurong West		1195
Sembawang Primary School	Government	Mixed	Sembawang		1759
Sengkang Green Primary School	Government	Mixed	Sengkang		1261
Seng Kang Primary School	Government	Mixed	Sengkang		1746
Shuqun Primary School	Government	Mixed	Jurong West		1220
Singapore Chinese Girls' School (Primary)	Government-aided	Girls	Novena		5026
South View Primary School	Government	Mixed	Chua Chu Kang		1241
Springdale Primary School	Government	Mixed	Sengkang		1262
St. Andrew's Junior School	Government-aided	Boys	Potong Pasir		5009
St. Anthony's Canossian Primary School	Government-aided	Girls	Bedok		5011
St. Anthony's Primary School	Government-aided	Mixed	Bukit Batok	Lasallian school	5259
St. Gabriel's Primary School	Government-aided	Boys	Serangoon	Montfortian-Gabrielite school	5012
St. Hilda's Primary School	Government-aided	Mixed	Tampines		5025
St. Joseph's Institution Junior	Government-aided	Boys	Novena	Lasallian school	5014
St. Margaret's Primary School	Government-aided	Girls	Rochor		5013
St. Stephen's School	Government-aided	Boys	Bedok	Lasallian school	5015
Tampines North Primary School	Government	Mixed	Tampines		1736
Tampines Primary School	Government	Mixed	Tampines		1201
Tanjong Katong Primary School	Government	Mixed	Marine Parade		1773
Tao Nan School	Government-aided, SAP	Mixed	Marine Parade	Affiliated to SHHK	5240
Teck Whye Primary School	Government	Mixed	Chua Chu Kang		1043
Telok Kurau Primary School	Government	Mixed	Bedok	Merged with Eunos Primary School in 2023	1218
Temasek Primary School	Government	Mixed	Bedok		1160
Townsville Primary School	Government	Mixed	Sembawang	Merged with Guangyang Primary School in 2023	1189
Unity Primary School	Government	Mixed	Chua Chu Kang		1750
Valour Primary School	Government	Mixed	Punggol		1273
Waterway Primary School	Government	Mixed	Punggol		1271
Wellington Primary School	Government	Mixed	Sembawang		1767
West Grove Primary School	Government	Mixed	Jurong West		1770
West Spring Primary School	Government	Mixed	Bukit Panjang		1265
Westwood Primary School	Government	Mixed	Jurong West		1258
White Sands Primary School	Government	Mixed	Pasir Ris	Merged with Coral Primary School in 2019	1749
Woodgrove Primary School	Government	Mixed	Woodlands		1758
Woodlands Primary School	Government	Mixed	Woodlands		1114
Woodlands Ring Primary School	Government	Mixed	Woodlands		1747
Xinghua Primary School	Government	Mixed	Hougang		1205
Xinmin Primary School	Government	Mixed	Hougang		1724
Xishan Primary School	Government	Mixed	Yishun		1227
Yio Chu Kang Primary School	Government	Mixed	Hougang		1143
Yishun Primary School	Government	Mixed	Yishun		1172
Yu Neng Primary School	Government	Mixed	Bedok		1658
Zhenghua Primary School	Government	Mixed	Bukit Panjang		1240
Zhonghua Primary School	Government	Mixed	Serangoon		1235

== See also ==
- Selegie Integrated Primary School
- List of secondary schools in Singapore
