= Kelvin Teo =

- Born: Teo Seh Kiat; Labuan, Malaysia
- Education: MBA, Master of Engineering in Material Science and Bachelor of Engineering in Electrical Engineering
- Alma mater: INSEAD, Massachusetts Institute of Technology, National University of Singapore
- Occupation(s): Management Consultant, Co-Founder of EasyEco International

Kelvin Teo

Chinese name
- Traditional Chinese: 張世傑
- Simplified Chinese: 张世杰
- Hanyu Pinyin: Zhāng Shìjié
- Jyutping: Zoeng1 Sai3 Git6
- Hokkien POJ: Tiuⁿ Sè-kia̍t
- Tâi-lô: Tiunn Sè-kia̍t

Kelvin Teo (simplified Chinese: 张世杰; traditional Chinese: 張世傑; pinyin: Zhāng Shìjié; Jyutping: Zoeng1 Sai3 Git6; Pe̍h-ōe-jī: Tiuⁿ Sè-kia̍t) is a management consultant whose first success was a million dollar business venture at the age of 20 while still in university. At age 27, he won Malaysia's first wedding related reality show, Love Me Do. He also co-founded EasyEco International and was a frequent columnist of several local newspapers.

== Early years ==
=== Education ===
Born in Labuan and raised in Kota Kinabalu, the capital of Sabah, Kelvin Teo did his high school at Kian Kok Middle School and undergraduate at National University of Singapore with a degree in Electrical Engineering. He went on to continue his study at Massachusetts Institute of Technology and graduated as one of the top 3 students in his course from Materials Science and Engineering. During his time at MIT, Kelvin enrolled for a cross-university programme at the Harvard Business School and wrote a research paper on China which identified investment patterns and predicted future trends as well as challenges that Singapore will have to face in its bid to have a bite in the China pie. He also holds an MBA with INSEAD.

== Entrepreneurship ==
Kelvin first success with entrepreneurship was his involvement with Geo-X, the company that he co-founded with his friends in National University of Singapore. As a group, they went on to win Start-Up Singapore Business Plan Competition, Megabucks International Business Plan Competition held in Kanpur and represented Singapore at Expo-Science International held in Moscow.

=== Easy Eco International ===
In 2007, Kelvin co-founded Easy Eco International, a start up consultancy company that specialized in clean technology, continuing the work that he has done with Professor Gerbrand Ceder during his postgraduate study in Massachusetts Institute of Technology in United States.

== Love Me Do ==
Kelvin Teo was one of the candidates for Malaysia's first wedding related reality programme, Love Me Do in 2009. This was the first public voting wedding contest for all Malaysians and Singaporeans. Kelvin and his wife Kimberly Yap were voted by the public as the winner at the season finale. In the final, they received a whopping 126,154 votes to win the contest that had attracted 1,850 couples and saw six months of intense competition, public online voting and blogging to decide the outcome. Kimberly wrote on her blog that Kelvin's romantic proposal to her on her birthday has helped them to garner many votes. Thang Han-Ni, Berjaya Group Hotels & Resorts’ Corporate Director, Marketing & Communications, said that the couple's story in overcoming the obstacles will be an inspiration to others.

The couple had won an all-expenses-paid designer beach wedding worth RM100,000 in the contest and appear as ambassadors in Berjaya Group Hotels & Resorts’ future charity programs.
