= Phil Pringle =

Australian evangelist (born 1952)

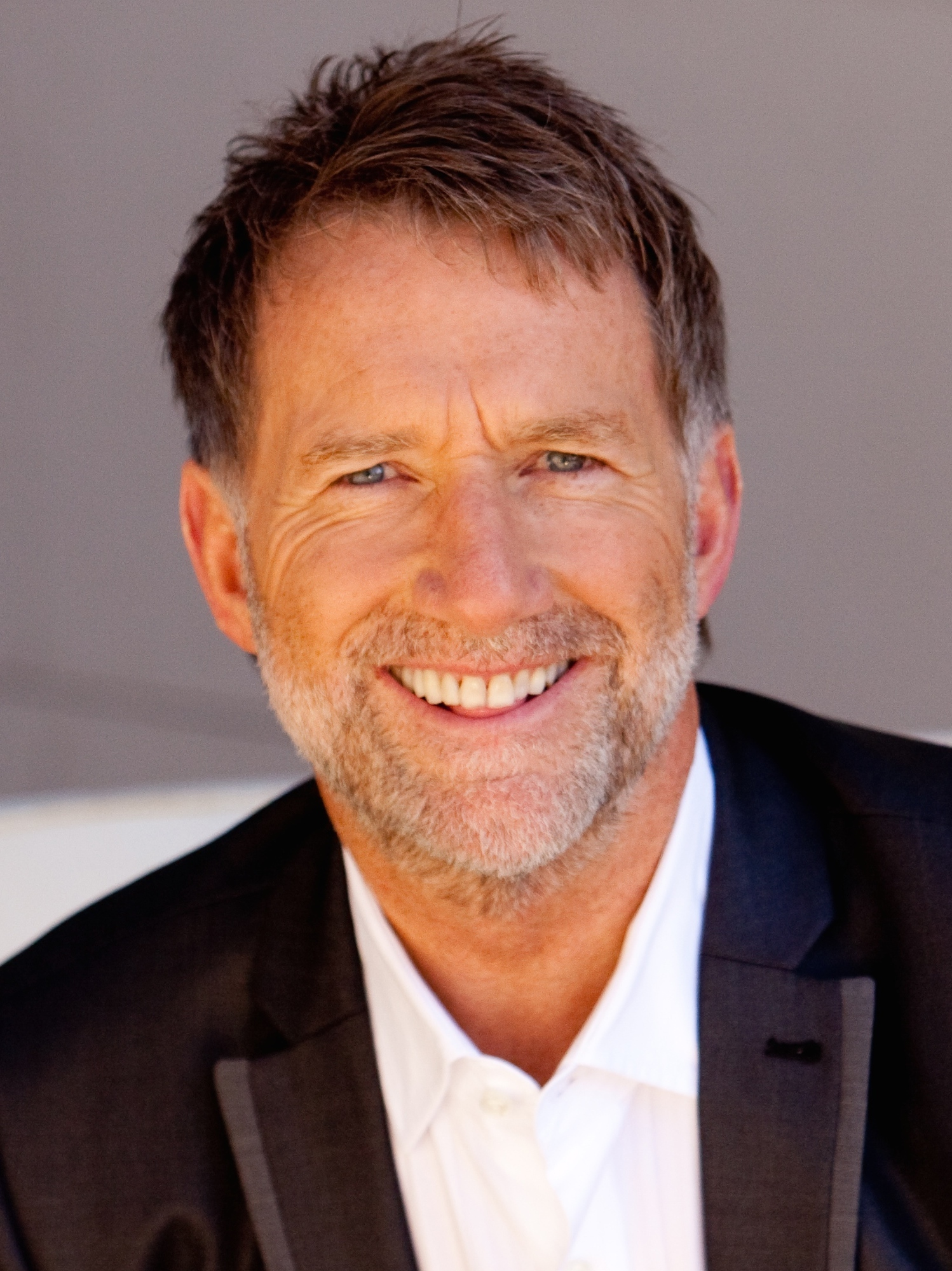
- Born: 21 May 1952 (age 74)
- Occupations: Author, evangelist, Bible teacher, artist
- Spouse: Christine Pringle
- Children: Rebekah, Daniel, Joseph
- Writing career
- Genre: Christian
- Website: philpringle.com

Philip Andrew Pringle OAM (born 21 May 1952) is a New Zealand-born Australian Christian evangelist. Pringle arrived in Sydney, New South Wales, from Christchurch in 1980 with his wife Chris. He is the senior pastor of C3 Church Sydney (formerly known as Christian City Church), which was started in a surf club in Dee Why before moving to a large, rented warehouse after an initial attempt at planting a church in the Sydney suburb of Roseville. He is the founder of C3 Church Global, a church planting movement. He is also the founder and president of Oxford Falls Grammar School, Sydney.

Pringle ministers to and occasionally preaches in City Harvest Church in Singapore where he is considered to be an advisory pastor and a long-time friend and mentor of that organisation's leader, Kong Hee. Pringle is a member of the board of directors of Dr Yonggi Cho's organisation "Church Growth International."

== Bibliography ==
- Phil Pringle (2017). IN HIM - A Daily Devotional. PaX Ministries. ISBN 978-0975190531.
- Phil Pringle (2007). Keys to Financial Excellence. Whitaker House. ISBN 978-1603740531.
- Phil Pringle (2015). The Born Identity. PaX Ministries. ISBN 978-0958582742.
- Phil Pringle (2014). Parable of the Dog. PaX Ministries. ISBN 978-0646916439.
- Phil Pringle (1999). Healing the Wounded Spirit: Complete and Perfect Healing in Christ. PaX Ministries. ISBN 978-0958582711.
- Phil Pringle (2005). Faith: Moving the Heart and the Hand of God. Whitaker House. ISBN 978-0883681749.
- Phil Pringle (2005). You The Leader. Whitaker House. ISBN 978-0883688144.
- Phil Pringle (2008). But God. Christian Life. ISBN 978-1599793672.

== See also ==
- Charismatic movement
