= Feature-oriented positioning =

Feature-oriented positioning (FOP) is a method of precise movement of the scanning microscope probe across the surface under investigation. With this method, surface features (objects) are used as reference points for microscope probe attachment. Actually, FOP is a simplified variant of the feature-oriented scanning (FOS). With FOP, no topographical image of a surface is acquired. Instead, a probe movement by surface features is only carried out from the start surface point A (neighborhood of the start feature) to the destination point B (neighborhood of the destination feature) along some route that goes through intermediate features of the surface. The method may also be referred to by another name—object-oriented positioning (OOP).

To be distinguished are a "blind" FOP when the coordinates of features used for probe movement are unknown in advance and FOP by existing feature "map" when the relative coordinates of all features are known, for example, in case they were obtained during preliminary FOS. Probe movement by a navigation structure is a combination of the above-pointed methods.

FOP method may be used in bottom-up nanofabrication to implement high-precision movement of the nanolithograph/nanoassembler probe along the substrate surface. Moreover, once made along some route, FOP may be then exactly repeated the required number of times. After movement in the specified position, an influence on the surface or manipulation of a surface object (nanoparticle, molecule, atom) is performed. All the operations are carried out in automatic mode. With multiprobe instruments, FOP approach allows to apply any number of specialized technological and/or analytical probes successively to a surface feature/object or to a specified point of the feature/object neighborhood. That opens a prospect for building a complex nanofabrication consisting of a large number of technological, measuring, and checking operations.

== See also ==
- Feature-oriented scanning
