= Michael G. Scales =

Michael G. Scales is an American academic and president of Nyack College and Alliance Theological Seminary, who was inaugurated on April 27, 2007. In June 2015, the Nyack/ATS Board of Trustees unanimously extended his role as chief officer for a fourth term.

== Biography ==
Scales was born in Gadsden, Alabama to Guy Dean Scales (1915 - 1985) and Vivian (née Tally). Following his graduation from high school in 1970, he attended Gadsden State Community College before going on to earn his B.S. (1975) in Bible and theology from Toccoa Falls College, his M.A. (1978) in humanities from Western Kentucky University, and his Ed.D. (1988) from the University of Georgia.

Prior to assuming the role of president, Dr. Scales served Nyack College/ATS as Executive Vice President (2000-2003) and Vice President for Advancement (1989-1993). He earned his BS (1975) in Bible and theology from Toccoa Falls College, his MA (1978) in humanities from Western Kentucky University, and his Ed.D. (1988) from the University of Georgia.

Scales pastored Sharon Cumberland Presbyterian Church (1975-1977) and as a juvenile counselor in a community-based treatment home before launching his career in school administration. From 1985 until 1989, he worked for a consulting firm aimed at helping colleges attract students and donors. In 1989, he founded Advantage Marketing, focusing specifically on Christian colleges. He also held roles in admissions and advancement at Toccoa Falls College, Agnes Scott College, North Greenville College, Nyack College, University of Sioux Falls, and The Master's College and Seminary.
