= C3 Church Global =

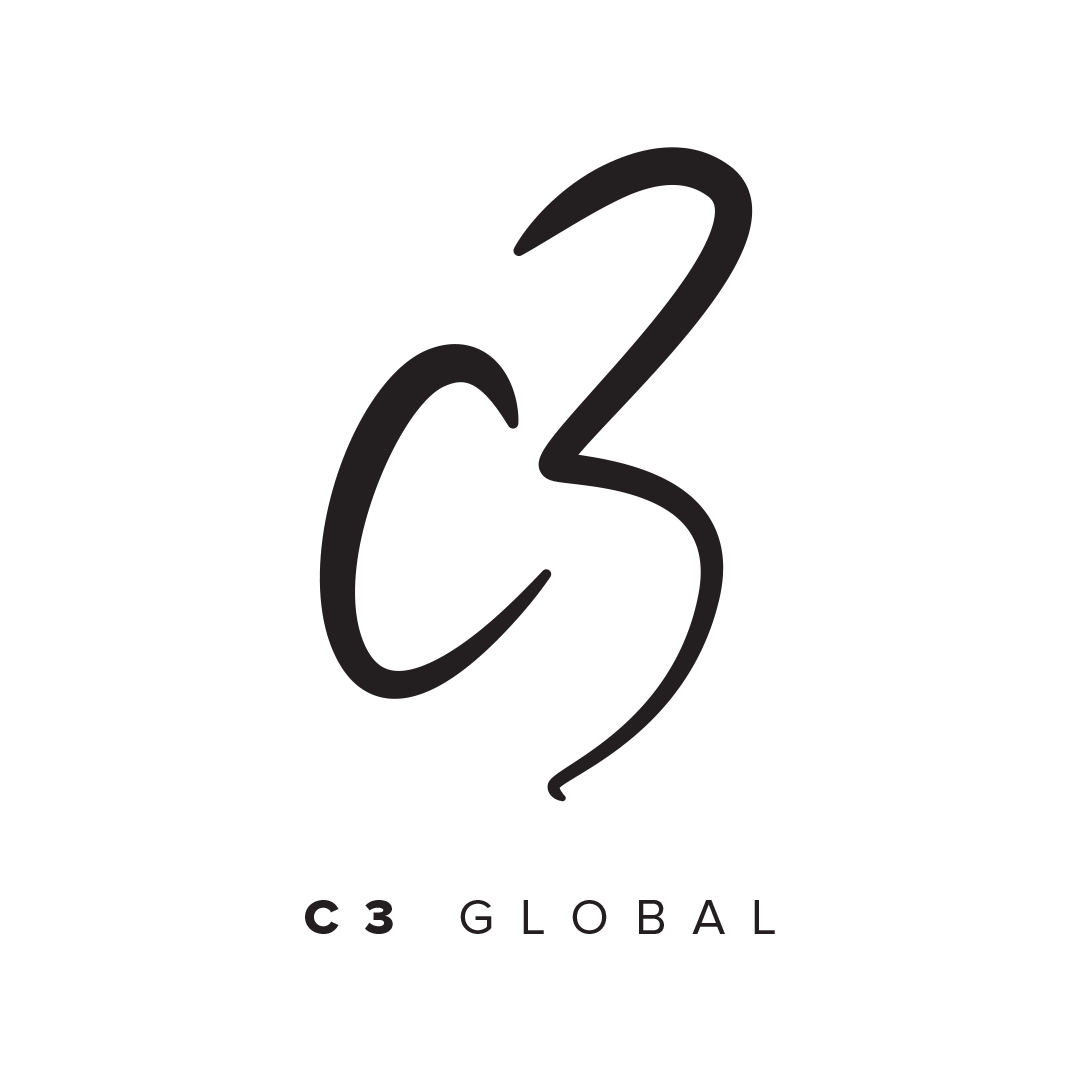
- Location: International
- Denomination: C3 Church (Pentecostalism, Evangelical, Charismatic)
- Website: www.c3churchglobal.com

History
- Founded: Easter 1980
- Founder: Phil Pringle Christine Pringle

C3 Church Global, formerly known as Christian City Church International (C3i), is a charismatic movement founded by Phil Pringle and Christine Pringle. The first church was started in Dee Why on the Northern Beaches of Sydney, Australia, and is now located in Oxford Falls. As of October 2019, C3 Church Global was a community of over 500 churches.

== History ==
Pastor Phil and Christine Pringle arrived in Sydney from New Zealand in 1980 to begin a church on the Northern Beaches of Sydney, Australia. Growing to 400 people within four years, the church began expanding and planting in other cities. The vision of 10 churches in 10 major cities was developed and the movement of Christian City Church began.

In 2008, at the "Here We Go" global conference held in Hawaii, Christian City Church announced the name change to "C3 Church".

== Media ==
In 2017, Global News took an inside look at C3 Toronto, one of the C3 Church Global locations around the world. The article details what a regular Sunday service looks like. Lead Pastor Sam Picken explains his approach to leading a church, and congregation member Mirelli Vanheer talks about how she found C3.

Eternity News published an article on C3 Church in April 2017, detailing C3's annual Presence Conference and the movement's approach to community.

Reference was made to C3 Church in the Business Review Weekly (BRW), Australian edition article "God's Millionaires". This article noted that "Prosperity theology is practised by the bigger Pentecostal churches, including Hillsong, Christian City Church and Paradise. This promotes the idea that it is a Christian's responsibility to achieve wealth and worldly success."

In 2019, A Current Affair aired an exposé of the Church's financial ideology and history, including its controversial practice of requesting large donations from members of its congregation in return for 'miracles'. C3 Church responded to the allegations levelled in an online statement.

== Criticism and controversy ==
The Cult Information and Family Support organization (CIFS) notes that C3 Church is being actively monitored by a self-appointed Christian watchdog group, run anonymously. Two accusations made by this group are of C3 controlling people and of teaching false doctrine.

Phil Pringle has been accused of 'grooming' church congregations to pay for legal fees after a friend of Pringle's, a pastor of an unrelated church was convicted of fraud for using church funds to fund his wife's music career.

During the 1980s, church elders within C3 were accused of failing to act on several situations of sexual abuse and molestation of young boys. In 2007, in the South Australian Supreme Court, paedophile Trevor John Russell, 57, of Stansbury, who had already pleaded guilty to sexually abusing four teenage boys at church camps in the early 1980s, also confessed to molesting five other teenage boys in the 1970s and '80s.

In 2014, the senior pastor at C3 Asheville in North Carolina, Nicholas Dimitris, received a federal prison sentence for his part in a real estate fraud. In 2017, a pastor within C3 was convicted of colluding with a person to defraud copyright of a large number of DVDs. Phil Pringle has maintained friendships with pastors around the world who have been convicted of financial fraud, including Kong Hee.

The church has also been accused of claiming to be progressive and inclusive while hiding the fact that it is strongly against gay marriage and does not allow sexually active gay members to fully participate in the church.
