= City Harvest Church =

Megachurch in Singapore

Coordinates: 1.343041°N 103.691915°E

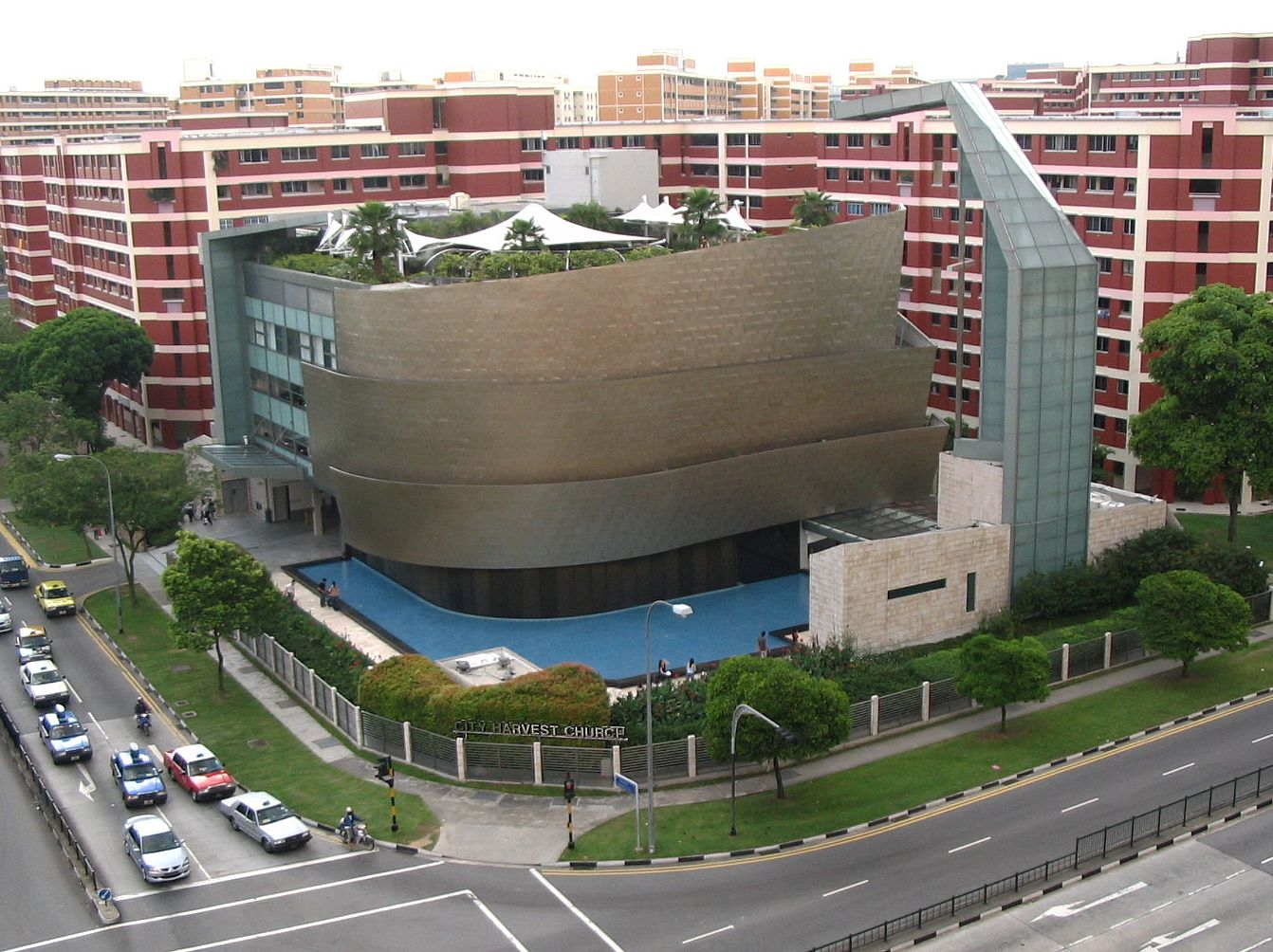
- City Harvest Church
- Location: 1 Raffles Boulevard, Suntec Singapore, Level 6, Halls 603-606, Singapore 039593
- Country: Singapore
- Denomination: Non-denominational, Charismatic, Pentecostalism
- Website: www.chc.org.sg

History
- Founded: 7 May 1989; 37 years ago
- Founder(s): Kong Hee and Sun Ho

Specifications
- Capacity: 6,000

City Harvest Church (Chinese: 城市丰收教会) or CHC is a pentecostal megachurch in Singapore.

Founded in 1989 by Kong Hee, the church officially bases its values on Charismatic and Pentecostal teachings, with emphases on such doctrines as the Great Commandment, the Great Commission and the Cultural Mandate.

City Harvest Church is a congregational member of the National Council of Churches of Singapore. Services are held at its church building in Jurong West and rented hall space at Suntec International Convention Centre.

In 2015, six church leaders and fund or finance managers were found guilty of criminal breach of trust and falsification of accounts. When all six of them appealed against the verdict and sentences, the Appeal Court found them guilty of basic criminal breach of trust and reduced their sentences. The Court also noted that the six were not motivated by personal gain, and no permanent loss was intended or caused to CHC – all the monies were returned to the church with interest.

The church was one of three megachurches to make it to a list of Singapore's 10 largest charities, according to a report by The Straits Times in 2019.

== Overview ==
CHC has two main worship venues: its conventional church, completed in 2002 in the western part of the island, which emphasizes size and modern aesthetics and has a main hall capacity of 2,300 people; and the downtown Suntec Singapore Convention & Exhibition Centre, used since 2010 for its larger worship space.

The church's building features four levels of basement. It has been cited by Singapore Records as the "world's deepest church." With a main auditorium spanning 1,700 square meters, the church is also listed by Singapore Records as the largest church structure in the South-East Asian Peninsula.

The Straits Times reported that CHC's congregation size peaked at 33,000 in 2010 before investigations into its leaders began. In 2012, Global Church Network listed CHC as one of the ten largest churches outside of the US. The church reported that it had a congregation size of 15,654 in 2019 and an average weekly viewership of 17,276 for its online services and resources in 2020. CHC exhibits a young membership profile relative to established mainline denominations. As of 2014, 13.9% of the membership are between 20 and 24 years old, and 49.2% are between the ages of 25 and 45. As of 2018, the demographics revealed that 45.1% are men, 54.9% are women, 34.1% are married, and 61.9% are single. 55.9% of them are working adults, while most of the rest are serving the military, non-salaried, students, or children. As of 2025, the church reported a congregation size of 24,546. The cumulative membership, including its 269 branch and affiliate churches stands at 80,040.

The church was founded by Kong Hee and his wife Sun Ho on 7 May 1989 and held its first service at Peace Centre. It first functioned as "Ekklesia Ministry," a youth department under the legal covering of Bethany Christian Centre, an Assemblies of God church. On 21 December 1992, City Harvest Church was set up as a society. It was registered as a charity with the Singapore government on 16 October 1993.

From 2002, Kong began to teach on the Cultural Mandate and encourage the church members to excel in the marketplace. On 1 November 2005, Kong withdrew himself from the staff payroll and he now serves the church as an honorary founder/senior pastor. Later, in an investigation leading to trial and conviction, it was revealed that Kong had set up a private fund and diverted over $3 million of tithes and pledges to a 'multi purpose account'. Givers to the account were told this was for the funding of a 'Crossover project'.

CHC founded the City Harvest Community Services Association (CHCSA) in 1997. CHCSA is involved in elderly services, direct social services, patient care services, as well as youth and community projects. In December 2004, CHC was involved in the humanitarian relief work of the Indian Ocean tsunami. The church sent aid and disaster relief workers to the 2010 Haiti earthquake.

CHC has actively pursued church planting and evangelism across the region.

== Controversies ==
=== Criminal Breach of Trust ===
Since the beginning of the 21st century, one of the biggest corruption case on the island revolved around City Harvest Church and founders Kong Hee involving a total of S$50 million of funds misused. Six persons from the senior leadership, including its church founder Kong Hee, were convicted of the misuse of millions of dollars of the church's money. The court found that the church's senior leadership had channeled $24 million from CHC's Building Fund into sham bonds in music production company Xtron and glass-maker Firna. The purpose of the restricted Building Fund was specifically for building or investment. They used the money to fund the singing career of Kong's wife Ho Yeow Sun, as part of the Crossover Project, a church mission which they said was to evangelise through Ms Ho's music. Expenses revealed by court records included a house in Hollywood that cost $28,000 a month in rent; a whole entourage of staff; a $1.9 million paycheck to rapper Wyclef Jean to produce the "China Wine" video; as well as another $500,000 to sweep up her albums when they tanked.

The six appealed the verdict, and on 7 April 2017, the Court of Appeal reduced their sentences by approximately half, based on its finding that “the appellants should only have been convicted of the offence of criminal breach of trust simpliciter under section 406 of the Penal Code”. The judges said it was a situation that involved no personal gain on the part of the six, and that they believed their acts, especially in sham investments would advance the interest of the church.

A Criminal Reference filed by the AGC in a bid to reinstate the original convictions was heard by a five-judge Court of Appeal and dismissed on 1 Feb 2018.

=== "Words of comfort" Sermon ===
In 2012, during a sermon delivered by Kong which was recorded and later posted on YouTube, Kong said that he identified with the experience of Jesus Christ at his crucifixion and that God said in reply "I'm so sorry, but you need to go through this by yourself, to bring a change to your generation.". While viewers of the video interpreted that Kong said that God apologized to Kong for the church's legal troubles and drew overwhelming negative responses. In response, The Christian Post said that it was taken out of context and interpreted wrongly and that it should be treated as words of comfort for Kong's ensuing trial. Some City Harvest Church worshippers responded in kind that it should be interpreted as words of comfort.

=== Sun Ho Hacking Incident ===
In 2013, a hacking incident took place involving founding clergy Sun Ho after hackers self-styled "Messiah" hacked her official website, following which a police report was made by City Harvest Church. Around the same time, a spam-like email was further published on the Internet that involved another self-styled "Messiah-Two" making allegations regarding her. The suspected "Messiah", James Raj, was arrested the same year for hacking into the website of the Prime Minister's Office. He had prior drug convictions.

=== S$310 million Suntec investment ===
On 6 March 2010, City Harvest Church announced that it had purchased a significant stake in Suntec Convention Centre and will be using its facilities for church services, the project will cost an estimated S$310 million, including shares acquisition, renovation, and rental costs. Church founder Kong Hee said in a statement that the move "allows [the church] to move from a present expensive rental model to a more financially sustainable ownership model for the long term". However, some brought up the point that as a registered charity, CHC's income – expected to include profits and dividends from space rental and tenant leases in Suntec Singapore in the future – is non-taxable. The church has clarified that the investment is indirect, through a wholly owned subsidiary for the purpose of taxation and separate accounting. Questions surfaced among the public whether religious organizations, which are registered as charities, should be allowed to go into business using what are essentially donor funds.

The Commissioner of Charities (COC) sought clarifications on the transaction. The church stated it was under a non-disclosure agreement which required the details of the transaction to remain confidential, but explained that the investment was made through a holding company that is not a charity organization and does not enjoy tax breaks; and had disclosed details of the deal to the COC as well as the Urban Redevelopment Authority upon request. The church also said that there was a "strong and unfounded allegation" floating online that the management board and Kong were "deliberately concealing a number of embarrassing facts from its members" with regard to the Suntec investment, saying that the allegation was "furthest from the truth", and later released a notice stating that Charities and foundations often use donor funds to invest and generate sustainable income for their intended causes.

On 21 July 2012, the church announced details of its investment in Suntec Singapore. A total of 39.2% shareholding was acquired at a total cost of $97.75 million. Public-listed Suntec REIT holds the other 60.8%. The remaining balance in the projected building fund will be used for costs such as equipment, furniture and fittings, periodical shifting costs (due to other events at the venue), committed rentals, optional rentals and refundable rental deposits. In 2013, it was revealed that the church had undertaken a $50m loan with high interest to finance the acquisition of additional shares, as the building fund had largely been exhausted over the years on venue and equipment rentals, while using the Singapore Expo from 2006 to 2010. If the church is unable to finance the loan, it may in default lose up to 19.2% of its shareholding as part of the loan agreement.

== See also ==
- Christianity in Singapore
