= St Andrew's School, Singapore =

St Andrew's School
- 圣安德烈书院; Sekolah St Andrew செயிண்ட் ஆண்ட்ரூ பள்ளி

Location
- 2 Francis Thomas Drive, Singapore 359337 (SAS(J)); 15 Francis Thomas Drive, Singapore 359342 (SAS(S)); 5 Sorby Adams Drive, Singapore 357691 (SAJC); Singapore
- 1.331278°N 103.865139°E

Information
- Type: Government-Aided
- Motto: Up and On
- Religious affiliation: Anglican
- Established: 8 September 1862; 163 years ago
- Session: Single-session
- School code: 5009(SAS(J)); 7015 (SAS(S)); 0804 (SAJC)
- Principal: SAS(J) — Elsie Poey (Mrs); SAS(S) — Lee Han Hwa (Mr); SAJC — Tham Kine Thong (Mr)
- Grades: 1 to 12 (Junior, Secondary, Junior College)
- Gender: Male (SAS(J) and SAS(S)); Co-educational (SAJC)
- Enrollment: approx. 5000
- Campuses: St Andrew's Village (Woodsville & Potong Pasir)
- Campus size: 13.5 ha
- Color: Navy Blue White
- Affiliation: Schools under the Anglican Diocese of Singapore
- Alumni: St Andrew's Alumni (SAA)
- Vision: Home of Servant Leaders who bring life to the Nations
- Identity: Saints
- Website: SAS(J); SAS(S); SAJC

St Andrew's School (abbreviation: SAS) is a family of schools in Singapore, affiliated to each other as well as to the Anglican Diocese of Singapore. It comprises St Andrew's School (Junior) (SAS(J)), St Andrew's School (Secondary) (SAS(S)) and St Andrew's Junior College (SAJC). The schools are often referred to as The Saints' Family.

Together, the three schools offer primary, secondary and pre-university education, having an enrolment of 4000 to 5000 students.

SAS(J) and SAS(S) are located in the Woodsville Campus, while SAJC is located across the Kallang River in the Potong Pasir Campus. Both campuses are linked to each other by the Jacob Ballas Bridge, forming St Andrew's Village (SAV).

The junior and secondary schools have always only admitted male pupils, but female pupils were admitted to the pre-university or 'A' level classes when they were run from the senior school previously. St Andrew's Junior College has always been co-educational since being separated from the secondary school.

The school is also affiliated with other Anglican and Presbyterian schools in Singapore, including St Margaret's Primary School (St Andrew's Sister School), St Margaret's Secondary School, St Hilda's Primary School, St Hilda's Secondary School, the Anglican High School, Presbyterian High School and Kuo Chuan Presbyterian Secondary School.

The name of the school is usually abbreviated as SAS, or sometimes as SA. Its pupils and alumni ('Old Boys' and 'Old Girls') are referred to as Saints. The alumni for all former students of St Andrew's School is St Andrew's Alumni, and was formed in 1921.

== History ==
=== Chin Chew Street (1862–1863) ===
SAS was founded on 8 September 1862 by Edward Sherman Venn through adopting a private institution owned by Sim Quee and Tye Kim in Chin Chew Street, in Singapore. The Anglican missionary led by Venn funded the school. Sim Quee and Tye Kim remained as headmasters of their school. This was unusual for the day as most missionary schools were not usually headed by Asians. The school was then known as the St Andrew's Church of England Mission School.

=== Upper Hokkien Street (1863–1872) ===
On 10 September 1863, the school moved to Upper Hokkien Street because of the need for a better building and more space for the growing school. Soon after, Cheok Loy Fatt was appointed the headmaster.

After a couple of years, the school suffered from financial difficulties, and financial support was withdrawn in 1866. Venn died in 1866, which might explain why financial support was withdrawn at this time. In 1872, the colonial chaplain J.A. Beccles successfully applied to the government for financial aid. Thus, on 22 May 1872, St Andrew's School became a grant-in-aid institution.

=== Victoria Street (1872–1875) ===
In 1872, Beccles was succeeded by George Frederick Hose as colonial chaplain. Meanwhile, the growing school moved to Victoria Street. Hose invited William Henry Gomes to act as school superintendent, in which the school prospered and grew.

During the early days at the Victoria Street site, both Hose and Gomes knew that the growth of the school would be hampered by poor accommodation. The government gave the school a 4-acre (16,000 m^{2}) piece of land on the then Government Hill with a frontage on Stamford Road.

=== Stamford Road (1875–1940) ===
The first building to go up was the chapel in 1875 and in that same year, the school vacated its cramped premises in Victoria Street and moved into the Stamford Road site. Classes were held in the chapel, which also became an important centre of public worship.

J. Romanis Lee, who became headmaster from 1912, was a benefactor of the school as it acquired many of its modern characteristics during his period as headmaster. He set about expanding the premises of the school and raised the status of the school from a second grade school to top grade in 1914, in which the school started to offer the Senior Cambridge Examination. He also established a tradition of sports in the school; the school excelled in boxing and rugby union.

Joseph Lee became headmaster in 1924 and the enrolment increased to 800. Lee established John Oxenham's poem "Up and On" as the school song. The first issue of the school magazine, "Up and On", made its appearance in 1928.

Reginald Keith Sorby Adams succeeded Lee as the next headmaster on 1 October 1934. By that time, St Andrew's had become well known for its boxing and rugby. The need for a bigger area than the cramped site at Stamford Road had become a problem by the early 1930s. There were scarcely enough classrooms and there was no playing field for a school which showed so much enthusiasm and aptitude for outdoor games.

This site ultimately became the site of the National Library of Singapore from 1960, before it moved to Victoria Street.

=== Pre-war Woodsville (1940–1942) ===
In 1938, Woodsville Estate comprising 7.49 hectares (18.5 acres) of land, was purchased for $60,000. Adams, assisted by archdeacon Graham White, played a major role in the moving of the school to the Woodsville site, after previously rejecting two sites in Tanjong Katong and on Serangoon Road. The two-storey school buildings were completed and officially opened by S. E. Jones, the officer administering the government, on 29 July 1940. The start of World War II in Singapore had the school closed.

=== Post-war Woodsville (1945–1990) ===
Immediately after the war, the school was the first to re-open. The school was then divided into lower school and upper school. Until the arrival of Adams, who had just been released from internment, D.D. Chelliah acted as headmaster. As the school population grew, the school grew as well with the addition of another floor in 1952. The Lim Teck Kin Tower was also added in that year.

In 1955, the lower school was renamed the Junior School, and the upper school was renamed Secondary School. In 1956, due to the rapid growth of the junior school, it was further separated into two schools: Junior I and Junior II. Each junior school was run by its own headmaster, but this changed from 1960 onwards when both schools shared the same head.

In 1969, pre-university classes started and in 1978, St Andrew's Junior College was established and moved to Malan Road. By the 1980s, the Woodsville site was unable to handle the growth of both junior schools and the secondary school. Meanwhile, with nearby Potong Pasir developed, the school requested that a 4.18-hectare site allocated for education would be used for the St Andrew's School (secondary). Construction of the secondary school started on 3 November 1984 and the buildings were opened in July 1986.

=== 1990-present ===
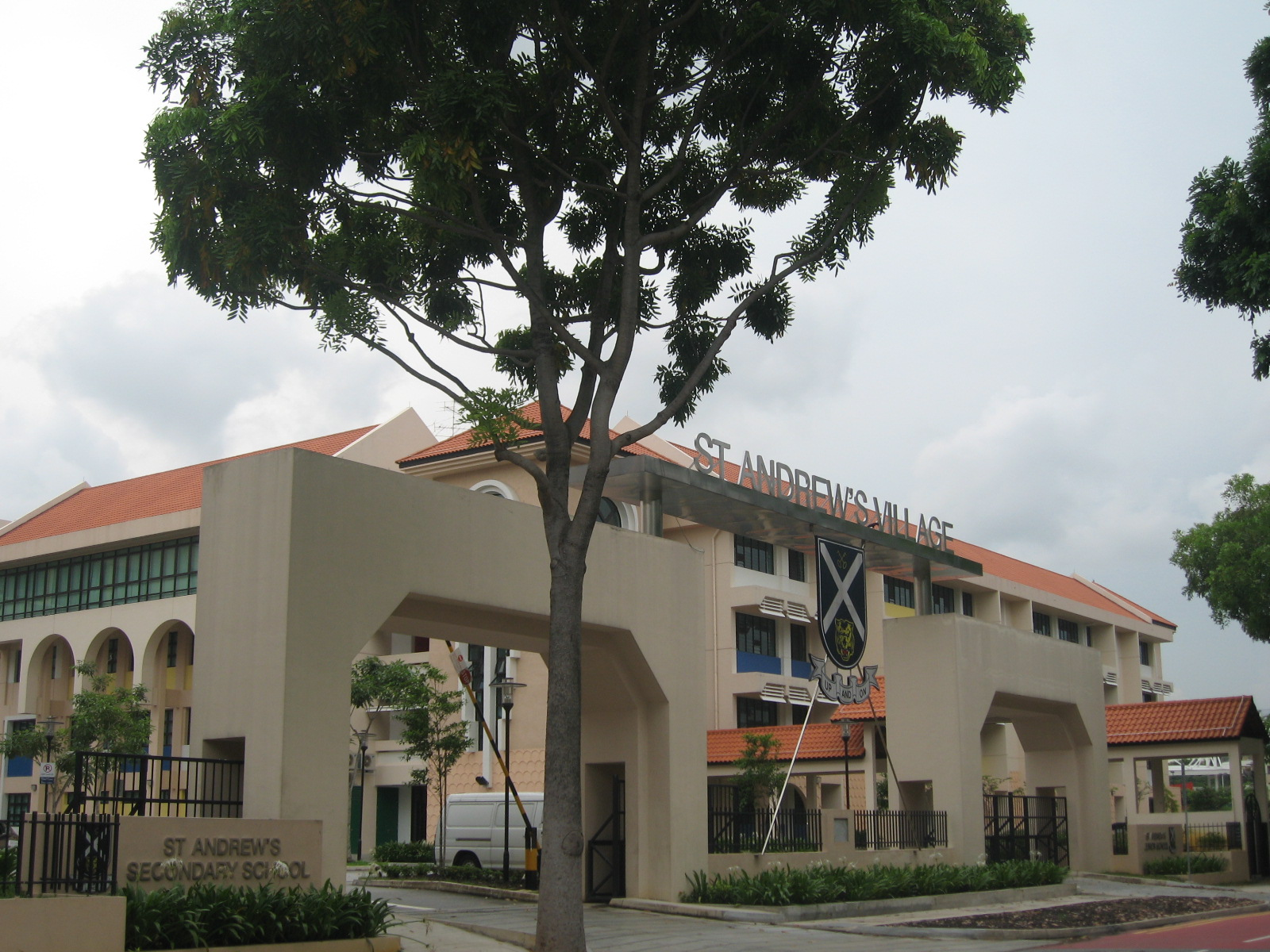
The St Andrew's Village now houses all three schools of St Andrew's School, three churches, a hostel named St Andrew's Hall, as well as The Diocese of Singapore.

In 1990, the two junior schools were combined into one school: St Andrew's school (junior). In 1996, the school had to relocate due to noise pollution from the recently upgraded Pan-Island Expressway. The school was relocated in January 1996 and the new school building was declared open by the then Minister for Education, Teo Chee Hean, in 1997.

As part of the St Andrew's Village project, all three schools were planned to return to Woodsville and Potong Pasir. Renovation and expansion of the junior school started in 2003, and the new buildings opened in December 2004. Construction of a new secondary school started in 2003, opposite the junior school along Francis Thomas Drive, and opened in December 2004. Construction of the junior college started in June 2003 after the secondary school vacated the site and shifted to its holding location. The junior college opened in December 2005 and a ceremony was held to mark its return to Woodsville/Potong Pasir. The village was officially opened on 26 August 2006, with the ceremony being held at the 1000-seater Cultural Centre in the junior college.

In addition to these three schools, the village also houses the diocesan office, the Ascension Kindergarten and three church buildings: the Chapel of the Resurrection, Chapel of the Holy Spirit and Church of Ascension. Some of the new facilities at the village include an Olympic size swimming pool, a 1,000-seat performing arts centre (Cultural Centre), air-conditioned school halls, gymnasiums, indoor basketball court, roof-top basketball court, tennis courts, cafe, rockwall, astro-turf artificial field and a sheltered bridge across the Kallang River to connect the junior and secondary schools to the junior college across the river. In 2010, piling work began for the construction of St Andrew's Hall, a 12-storey hostel with sufficient rooms to accommodate up to 600 students with facilities including a dining room for 600 people, an adjoining multipurpose hall as well as a clinic to serve the residents of the hall and St Andrew's Village. St Andrew's Hall was officially opened on 25 August 2012.

Construction for a new combined indoor sports hall at the existing site of the secondary school canteen block commenced in November 2016 with target for completion by end 2018. The new double size indoor sports hall block includes a new canteen for the secondary school. The junior school also commenced the PERI upgrading in the same period which will see construction above the current library as well as a new block at the end of the quadrangle facing the junior college.

There are also currently plans to redevelop the old science block which used to house the pre-university classes and currently houses Ascension Kindergarten. The redevelopment plans will include a new student leadership centre. The redevelopment plan is expected to be executed upon the completion of the indoor sports hall and PERI upgrading.

== Culture ==
=== Saints' spirit ===
The students of the school are encouraged to support the school sports teams. Particularly during semifinals and finals matches, the entire school is usually in full force at the venue to support the school team, wearing their widely recognised blue and white hoops. Cheering is led by the prefectorial board and the student government.

The school's rugby team also has its own battle cry, which is called the Saints' battle cry. It is normally mistaken by people as the haka. It is usually performed before the start of the match at a final or at special events.

The Saints' spirit also permeated into music producing members of such recording artists as The Sundowners, Tornados, Wes Cossacks, Straydogs, and Electrons with Rex Goh Tee Huat. The latter went on to join Australia's Air Supply.

=== Sports ===
The school has been famous since the 1930s, and in 1962, 1963, 1964, 1965 and 1966 concurrently, under the dedicated tutelage of Mr Keong Snr, it rose to a new high with its boxing and rugby dominance over Singapore Boy's Town, Anglo-Chinese School, and Raffles Institution. Since the 1970s, the school has won the national championships consistently. The 1990s saw competition from Anglo-Chinese School (Independent) and Raffles Institution, but St Andrew's has had a major revival in the sport in recent years.

The school also excels in cricket and hockey. Under the guidance of the cricket master Philip Ng, the school's cricket team saw success from 1998 onwards, with eight of its eleven players being called up for national under-15 representations in their first year of the game. The rivalry between Raffles Institution and St Andrew's continued in the ovals as the teams battled for the championship titles over the next few years.

=== Houses ===
The school has a house system aimed at intra-school sporting competitions. The school originally had eleven houses. Today, there are five houses throughout the school, from the junior school to the junior college. The five houses are named after important people in the school's history:

- Venn (black), after Edward Sherman Venn, who was founder of the school in 1862,
- Hose (blue), after George Frederick Hose, who was colonial chaplain in the 1860s,
- Loy Fatt (yellow), after Cheok Loy Fatt, who was headmaster in the 1870s,
- Gomes (red), after William Henry Gomes, who was school superintendent during the 1870s, and
- Romanis (green), after J. Romanis Lee, who was headmaster in the 1910s.

=== School song, hymn and crest ===
The school song was introduced by Joseph Lee. The words of the song are from John Oxenham's poem Up and On. All three schools share the same school song, school hymn and school crest.

School crest
The official heraldic description of the crest is: Azure, a saltire argent, in chief keys, in base a tiger's face. Simply, the crest is a blue shield, with a silver diagonal cross. In the top quarter are two keys, and in the lower quarter is a tiger's face.

The blue shield and silver diagonal cross is the St Andrew's Cross. The keys represent the Keys to Knowledge and Heaven, and the tiger's face is a local symbol of strength.

== Schools ==
=== St Andrew's Junior School ===
St Andrew's Junior School (SAJS) started off as the lower school of St Andrew's School after World War 2. After being renamed in 1956, the school was split into two schools, but were combined in 1990. The school later moved to a site in Potong Pasir because of noise pollution caused by the recently upgraded Pan-Island Expressway in 1996.

Following construction of the St Andrew's Village, the school moved into new buildings at the same Potong Pasir site in December 2004 at 2 Francis Thomas Drive, Singapore 359337.

=== St Andrew's Secondary School ===
St Andrew's Secondary School (SASS) started as the upper school of St Andrew's School after World War II. The school moved from the Woodsville site in July 1986 to its site in Potong Pasir across the Kallang River after the Woodsville buildings were deemed inadequate for the running of both the junior and senior classes. In mid-2003, the school shifted to the old Victoria School building at Kallang Bahru as a temporary holding site. As part of the St Andrew's Village project, the school has moved into new buildings beside SAJS since 2005 at 15 Francis Thomas Drive, Singapore 359342. The premises incorporates Woodsville House which was earmarked as a heritage building. Woodsville House used to be the residences of the principals of St Andrew's School and is now used as the offices for the head of Departments on the second floor and has a small heritage gallery on the ground floor.

=== St Andrew's Junior College ===
St Andrew's Junior College (SAJC) started as pre-university classes in 1969 and in 1978, moved to its site at 2 Malan Road. The college started the new year in 1978 with a brand new image, including a College Anthem of its own. However, in 1993, the college adopted back the original St Andrew's School crest, motto, song and hymn. The college has since returned to Potong Pasir as of 2006 as part of the St Andrew's Village project. It is situated on the former SASS site at 55 Potong Pasir Avenue 1, Singapore 358389. A sheltered pedestrian bridge, named Jacob Ballas Bridge, connects the junior college to the junior school and secondary school across the Kallang River.

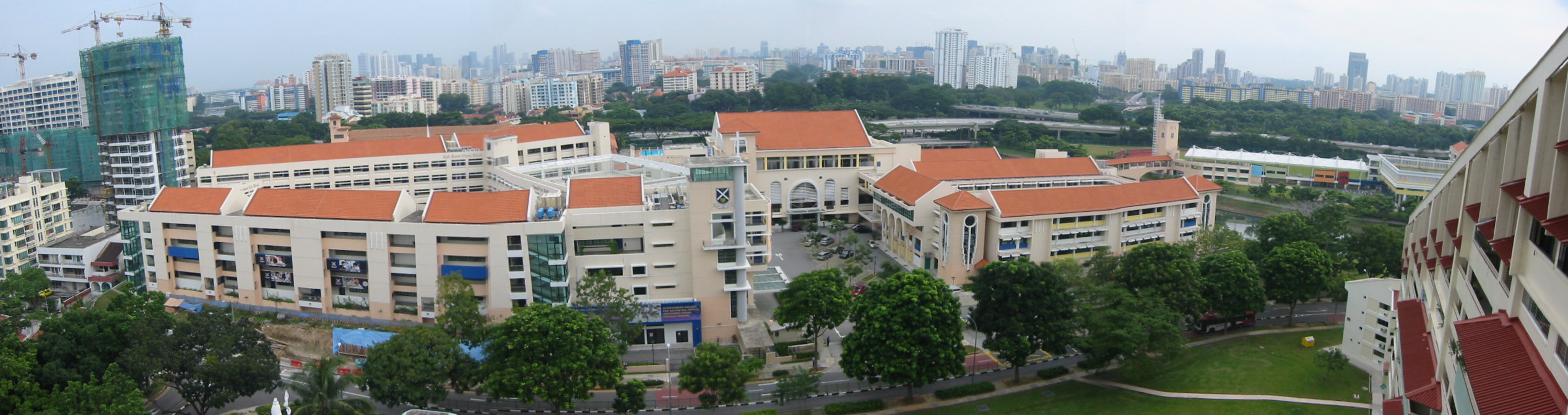
A top view of St Andrew's Secondary School (left) and St Andrew's Junior School (right). The multi-coloured grandstand of the running track of St Andrew's Junior College (top right) can be seen as well.

== Citations in literature ==
- "Hearts Courageous: The Story Of St Andrew's School". Charles, Belinda (principal, St Andrew's Junior College 1990-2001, St. Andrew's Secondary 2001-2010). Landmark Books. 2001. ISBN 981-073-131-0.
- Poem: "Sungei Kallang Afternoons At St Andrew's School" by Koh Buck Song (O levels 1979), published in The Worth Of Wonder (poetry collection by Koh Buck Song, Times Editions, 2001, ISBN 981-232-180-2); and in Singapore: Places, Poems, Paintings (book of poems and paintings about places in Singapore, Art & Artist Speak, 1993, ISBN 981-00-4559-X).
- ''Memoirs of a Migrant''. Thomas, Francis (principal, St. Andrew's Secondary 1963-1974). University Education Press, 1972. ISBN 978-981-07-5679-6

== Notable alumni ==
=== Politics ===
- Elizabeth Choy: War heroine, Obtained the Order of British Empire
- David Saul Marshall: Singapore's first chief minister, founder of the Workers' Party, politician, diplomat, Singapore's most successful criminal lawyer
- Benjamin Sheares: Singapore's second president
- Eddie Teo: former permanent secretary – prime minister's Office, Singapore's ambassador
- Fong Chong Pik (also known as "The Plen"): former leader of the Malayan Communist Party
- J B Jeyaratnam: Opposition politician and former secretary-general of the Workers' Party. First opposition politician to be voted into Singapore's Parliament after independence, in the 1981 Anson constituency by-election.
- Kenneth Jeyaretnam: Opposition politician. Secretary-general of the Reform Party of Singapore. Son of the late J.B. Jeyaretnam.
- Paul Tambyah: Opposition politician. Chairman of the Singapore Democratic Party.
- Harpreet Singh: Opposition politician, member of the Workers' Party.
- Noeleen Heyzer: executive secretary of the Economic and Social Commission for Asia and the Pacific; 1967 Pre U 2 Med
- S. Iswaran: former minister for transport
- Michael Palmer: former speaker of Parliament

=== Law ===
- David Saul Marshall: criminal lawyer, diplomat, politician, Singapore's first chief minister
- Joseph Grimberg: Singapore's Senior Counsel
- Harry Elias: Singapore's Senior Counsel

=== Business ===
- Harry Elias: Singaporean lawyer, founder of Harry Elias and partners
- Koh Boon Hwee: chairman – Yeo Hup Seng Group, chairman – DBS Group, chairman – Singapore Airlines, director – Temasek Holdings
- Brandon Wade: American internet entrepreneur, Founder of Seeking.com
- Jacob Ballas: Stockbroker; Inaugural chairman of the Malayan Stock Exchange, from 1962 to 1964, and later the Malaysia and Singapore Stock Exchange from 1964 to 1967; Founder of Singapore's then largest stockbrokers J.Ballas & Co.

=== Science, arts, education, journalism ===
- Kishore Mahbubani: dean of the National University of Singapore Lee Kuan Yew School of Public Policy, diplomat, former ambassador of Singapore to the United Nations, ex-president – United Nations Security Council
- Leslie Charteris (Leslie Charles Bowyer Yin): British-American author and screenwriter ('The Saint (Simon Templar)', etc.)
- Koh Buck Song: writer, journalist, author of Brand Singapore, business consultant, deputy chairman of Censorship Review Committee 2009–10.
- Woffles Wu: plastic surgeon, present head of the St Andrew's Alumni Association
- Xian Xinghai: Chinese composer
- Cherian George: Writer, journalist, author of numerous works, Professor of Media Studies at Hong Kong Baptist University

=== Entertainment ===
- Nickson Fong: First Singaporean to receive an Academy Award. CEO and co-founder, Egg Story Creative Production Pte Ltd. FX technical director and shot development technical director of The Matrix and its sequels.
- Stefanie Sun: Chinese pop singer
- Rex Goh: Musician. Former guitarist in Air Supply.
- JJ Lin Jun Jie: Chinese pop singer and composer
- Hong Junyang: Chinese pop singer, first male runner-up in MediaCorp Channel U Project Superstar 1 (Singapore)
- Devarajan Varadarajan: 2nd runner in Mediacorp Vasantham Star (Singapore), starring in Mediacorp Vasantham drama serials and Mediacorp Channel 5's Point of Entry, Seasons 1, 2, 3 and 4. Winner – Highly Commended Best Supporting Actor, Asian Television Awards 2012.

=== Sports ===
- U.K. Shyam: Former holder of Singapore's national 100 m sprint record at 10.37s. Singapore's national team.
- Indra Sahdan Daud: Former Singapore National football player and former National Captain.
- Wilfred Skinner: Former Singapore football goalkeeper and former field hockey centre-half.

== Media mentions ==
- Column on Elizabeth Choy – "She paid 40 cents for me to have this picture" by Koh, Buck Song (St Andrew's School 1970–79), The Straits Times 11 September 1995.
