= St Andrew's School (Secondary) =

St Andrew's School (Secondary) 圣安德烈中学

Location
- 15 Francis Thomas Drive, Singapore 359342; Singapore
- 1.3305°N 103.8635°E

Information
- Type: Government-aided
- Motto: Up and On
- Denomination: Anglican
- Established: 1862; 164 years ago
- Sister school: St Margaret's Secondary School
- Session: Single session
- School code: 7015
- Principal: Lee Han Hwa
- Gender: Male
- Enrolment: 1188
- Colour: Navy Blue White
- Affiliations: St Andrew's School (Junior); St Andrew's Junior College

St Andrew's School (Secondary) is a government-aided Anglican all-boys' secondary school in Potong Pasir, Singapore. Established in the 19th century, it still operates along traditional British lines and offers a four- or five-year programme, leading to the Singapore-Cambridge GCE Ordinary Level or Singapore-Cambridge GCE Normal Level examinations.

== History ==
The school was founded in 1862 by Reverend Edward Sherman Venn. In May 1872, after the Colonial Chaplain, Canon J. A. Beccles, applied to the government for financial aid, St Andrew's School became a grant-in-aid institution. The growing school moved from Upper Hokkien Street to Victoria Street and then in 1875 to a four-acre site along Stamford Road.

By the 1920s, the school's enrolment had reached 800 boys. In the 1930s, a system of prefects was instituted, and the school became known for its excellence in boxing and rugby in this period.

A new, larger campus was opened in Woodsville in 1940. More buildings were added in the 1950s, housing both the primary school and secondary school sections.

In 1986, the secondary school moved from Woodsville to a site in Potong Pasir across the Kallang River after the Woodsville buildings were deemed inadequate for the running of both the primary and secondary classes. In mid-2003, the school moved temporarily to the old Victoria School building at Kallang Bahru before returning to new buildings opposite St Andrew's Junior School in 2005 as part of the St Andrew's Village project, which brings together in one complex the Junior, Secondary and Junior College campuses.

Meanwhile, the old school buildings have been conserved and strengthened for re-use as a church, winning an Honourable Mention in the UNESCO Heritage Awards in 2007.

The St Andrew's Village has the first artificial rugby pitch in Singapore, shared between the secondary school and the primary school. It opened in January 2008 at a cost of S$1 million and provides an all-weather surface.

In celebration of the school's 163th founding anniversary in 2025, the school changed their name to St Andrew's School (Secondary), in conjunction with the junior school's renaming to St Andrew's School (Junior). The move was done to reflect the junior and secondary schools' common heritage.

== Academics ==
In 2008, St Andrew's was one of eight schools in Singapore to begin offering three new subjects at the Singapore-Cambridge GCE Ordinary Level: Creative 3D Animation, Fundamentals of Electronics, and Introduction to Enterprise Development.

In 2009, St Andrew's gained an Academic Value-Added Sustained Achievement Award from the Ministry of Education.

In 2010, the school was commended for including the St Andrew's River Programme in its science curriculum. Students investigated the impact on the Kallang River ecosystem and water quality of the building of the Marina Barrage and the enclosure of the Marina Basin.

From 2011, St Andrew's offers enhanced enrichment courses for upper secondary students taking the Singapore-Cambridge GCE Ordinary Level examinations in art.

In 2011, the school won the Special Lee Hsien Loong Award for Innovations in Normal Course.

== Sporting achievements ==
St Andrew's is one of the traditional "Big Three" rugby schools in Singapore, along with Raffles Institution and Anglo-Chinese School (Independent). The school has won a total of 157 national school titles for rugby since the late 1960s (based on available records). It has also held the Kiwi Cup from 1945 to 2013 inclusive. It has been awarded niche status in rugby by the Ministry of Education.

The school is also strong in hockey. The B Division Hockey Team emerged champions of the B Division Competitions in 2005, 2008 and 2018, 2023, as well as the C Division Hockey Team who emerged champions in 2010, 2012 and a recent win over Raffles Institution gave them another national title in 2014. The B Division Hockey Team also recently emerge as champions in the 2016 B Division Hockey Competitions after edging their opponents, Sengkang Secondary, in the finals with a score of 2-0. In cricket, St Andrew's was under-17 champions in 1996, 1997, 1998, 2001, 2002 and 2003.

== School culture ==
Despite being an Anglican school, it is not a requirement for students to be Christian. St Andrew's has a house system comprising five houses: Gomes, Hose, Loyfatt, Romanis and Venn. The school regards its system of prefects as an important element in maintaining an ethos of service and high standards of conduct.

=== School uniform ===
All students wear white short-sleeved shirts bearing the school badge. Lower secondary boys (Secondary 1 and 2) wear dark blue short trousers with white socks; Bermuda shorts are not permitted. Upper secondary boys (Secondary 3 onwards) wear dark blue long pants, although Secondary 3 students have been allowed to do so only since the 1990s. The prefects in upper secondary wear white long pants.

=== Discipline ===
St Andrew's maintains strict rules for behaviour inside and outside the school. There is a new system of demerit points, used in combination with the school's long-standing policy of corporal punishment in the form of caning on the palm of the hand or on the buttocks over clothing.

After a series of bullying cases attracted attention in 2003, the school stated that the situation at St Andrew's was no worse than at any other school, adding that bullies receive a stern warning; recalcitrant offenders or those who injure others are caned and ultimately expelled. A St Andrew's student caught bringing pornography to school would be caned either in public or in class, depending on the seriousness of the case.

For cases where the offence has a victim or where there is conflict to be resolved, a system of Restorative Practices is in place. "In the process of resolving the conflict, the offenders are asked to suggest the appropriate consequences for their action, which may include any form of punishment. However, any students who fail to cooperate with the teacher will be dealt with differently."

== Notable alumni ==
=== Politics ===
- Devan Nair: Third President of Singapore
- Fong Chong Pik: former leader of the Malayan Communist Party
- J. B. Jeyaretnam, politician, former secretary-general of the Workers' Party, founder of the Reform Party
- Kenneth Jeyaretnam: politician. Secretary-general of the Reform Party.
- David Saul Marshall, first Chief Minister of Singapore
- Michael Palmer: former Speaker of Parliament
- S. Iswaran: Former Minister of Transport
- Benjamin Sheares: Second President of Singapore
- Paul Tambyah: politician. Chairman of the Singapore Democratic Party.
- Francis Thomas, former politician and educator.
- Harpreet Singh Nehal: Senior Counsel at Audent Chambers, member of the Workers' Party.

=== Civil ===
- Kishore Mahbubani, academic and former diplomat

=== Legal ===
- Joseph Grimberg: Singapore's Senior Counsel
- Harry Elias: Singaporean lawyer, founder of Harry Elias and partners

=== Business ===
- Koh Boon Hwee: chairman – Yeo's Group, chairman – DBS Group, chairman – Singapore Airlines, director – Temasek Holdings
- Brandon Wade: American internet entrepreneur, Founder of Seeking.com
- Woffles Wu: plastic surgeon, present head of the St Andrew's Alumni Association

=== Arts ===
- Nickson Fong: First Singaporean to receive an Academy Award. CEO and co-founder, Egg Story Creative Production Pte Ltd. FX technical director and shot development technical director of The Matrix and its sequels.
- Cherian George: Writer, journalist, author of numerous works
- Rex Goh: Musician. Former guitarist in Air Supply.
- Koh Buck Song: writer, journalist, author of Brand Singapore, business consultant, deputy chairman of Censorship Review Committee 2009–10.

=== Sports ===
- Indra Sahdan Daud: Singapore national football player
- U.K. Shyam: Former holder of Singapore's national 100 m sprint record at 10.37s. Singapore's national team.
- Shaheed Alam: Singapore National Tennis Player
- Wilfred Skinner: former Singapore international football goalkeeper and field hockey centre-half.

=== Education ===
- Elizabeth Choy: War heroine, Obtained the Order of British Empire

=== Philanthropy ===
- Jacob Ballas: Well-known philanthropist, successful stockbroker.

== Affiliated schools ==
- St Andrew's Junior College
- St. Andrew's Junior School
