= Lim Koon Yang =

Singaporean clerk (1860–1934)

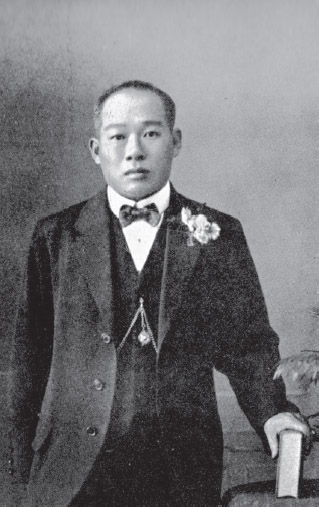
- Born: October 11, 1860; Singapore in the Straits Settlements
- Died: June 18, 1934 (aged 73); Singapore in the Straits Settlements
- Occupation: Legal Clerk
- Spouse: Ee Gek Eng
- Children: 3

Lim Koon Yang (11 October 1860 – 18 June 1934), was a Straits Chinese resident of Singapore. He was the managing clerk of the Braddell Brothers law firm from 1899-1932, and a manager of St. Andrew's School and St. Peter's Mission Church. At the time of his death, he was one of the oldest Straits Chinese people in Singapore, at the age of 73.

== Biography ==
Lim was born in Singapore on 11 October 1860 to Lim Sam Koh, a trader, and his wife Choo Guek Neo, a graduate of Miss Cooke's Chinese Girls' School. He originally lived with his family in his father's fruit plantation in Orchard Road, and moved with them when his father gave up his plantation and bought a large fruit plantation on Yio Chu Kang Road. He went to study in Raffles Institution when he was fourteen, and left the school in November 1878.

In 1878, Lim was employed in the Land Office for a few months under John Blundell. In 1879, he was employed in the legal firm owned by Jonas Daniel Vaughan, and remained there until Vaughan's disappearance in November 1890. Shortly after Vaughan's disappearance, Lim became a managing clerk in the Braddell Brothers, a legal firm. He retired on pension in April 1932.

Lim was a member of the committee of the Straits Chinese British Association. He was a manager of St. Andrew's School and the St. Peter's Mission Church. He was also a member of the Singapore Diocesan Association.

== Personal life ==
Lim married Ee Gek Eng, the second daughter of Ee Koon Hoey, one of the first members of the Celestial Reasoning Association (the first Straits Chinese debating society), on 28 February 1888. Together, they had at least one son, Lim Keng Hock, and two daughters. She died on 4 May 1906, and her funeral was held the next day.

Lim was a fan of horse racing, and was a member of the Singapore Sporting Club.

Lim died on 18 June 1934 from a heart attack. His funeral was held the next day.
