= Priscilla Krempl =

Singaporean school principal and rugby referee

Krempl in 1996

Priscilla Krempl (died 1 December 2011) was the principal of the Saint Andrew's Secondary School. Initially the first female qualified rugby referee in Singapore, she was appointed the school's principal in 1996, becoming the first woman to be appointed to that position and possibly the first female principal of an all-boys school on the island. She later served as the principal of Bedok Town Secondary School.

== Early life and education ==
Krempl was born in Malaysia to an Indian man and his Chinese wife. She came to Singapore and studied at the Saint Andrew's Junior College and later the National University of Singapore.

== Career ==
After graduating from university, Krempl was employed at the Saint Andrew's Secondary School, an all-boys school as a geography teacher in 1968. In the 1970s and 1980s, she coached the school's rugby team, which won several national titles. She became the first woman on the island to be a qualified rugby referee, as well as the first woman to serve as the teacher in charge of such a team. Her students included Shee Lay Toon, a prominent rugby player. In the 1990s, she also served as an official with the Singapore Rugby Union. However, she never played the game herself and instead learned by reading and taking advice from other referees. She became a referee in the late 1970s and passed the Singapore Society of Rugby Union Referees theory course in June 1983. She also served as the school's sports secretary and the teacher-in-charge of the school's squash team.

Krempl later became the school's vice-principal. In December 1994, she was appointed the acting principal of the school after the previous principal was posted to another secondary school. There were initially a few former students who reportedly had "reservations" about a woman being appointed principal, as the other two St. Andrew's Schools were already headed by women. However, most of the 65 teaching staff signed a letter in support of her holding the position. She was officially appointed its principal on 14 February 1996. This made her the first female principal of the school, as well as potentially the first female principal of an all-boys school in Singapore.

In October 2001, it was announced that Krempl would be leaving the school as she had been posted to Bedok Town Secondary School as principal from 2002 onwards. Her final day at the school was on 2 November. She retired from her position as principal of the Bedok Town Secondary School in 2007, after which she became a part-time teacher at the National Institute of Education.

== Personal life and death ==
Krempl was a Christian and the director of the choir of the school's Church of the Ascension. Despite being a fan of rugby, she viewed it as a "man's game" and believed her "femininity" to be "far more important" than "getting 'into it'".

Krempl was diagnosed with stage 4 cancer in November 2011. The illness started in her back and spread to her lungs and she suffered a stroke soon after her diagnosis which is believed to have led to her death. She died at the age of 66 on 1 December and her funeral was held on 4 December.
