= St Andrew's Village =

- 圣安德烈村
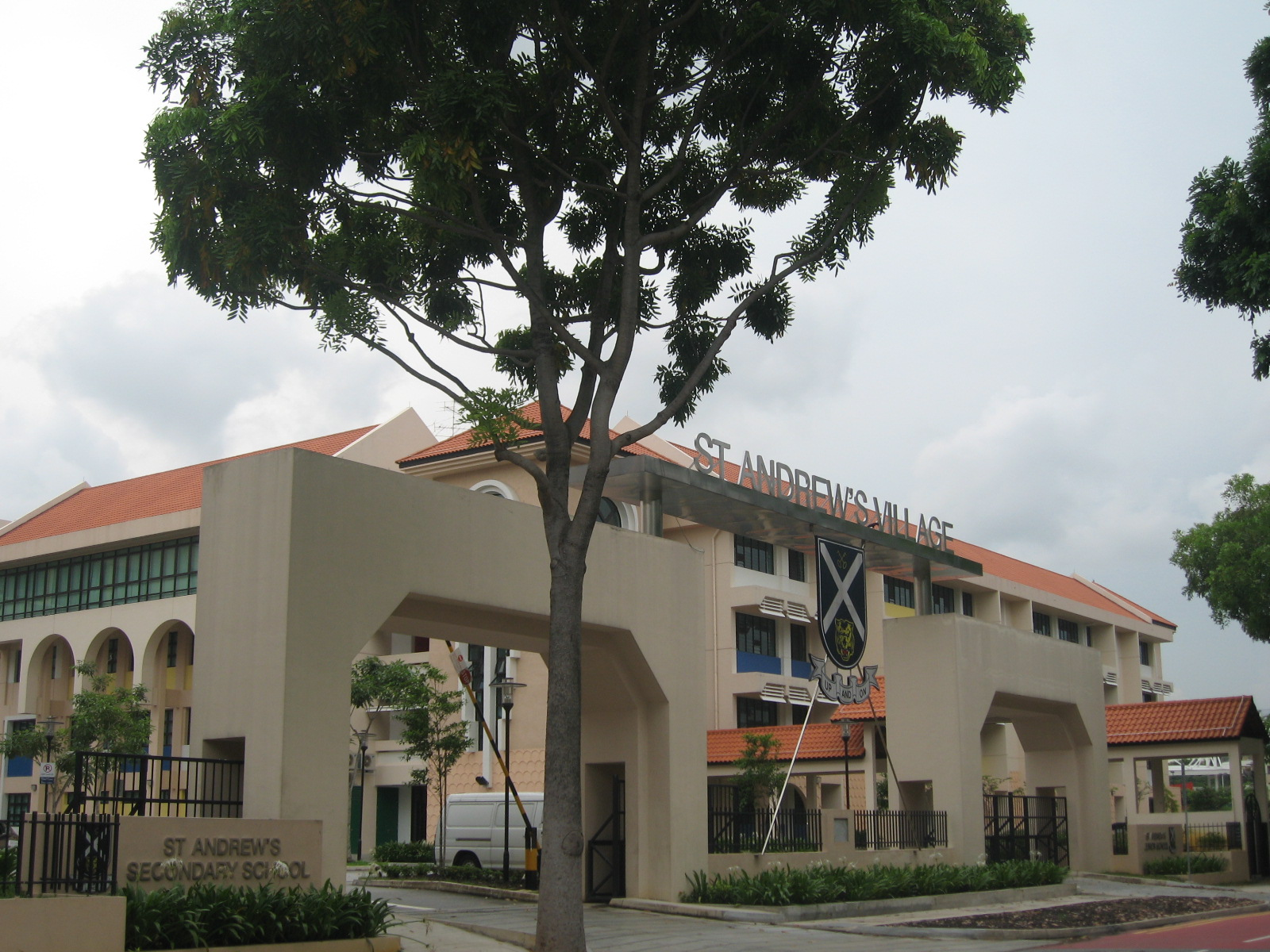

Location
- 2 Francis Thomas Drive, Singapore 359337 (SAS(J)); 15 Francis Thomas Drive, Singapore 359342 (SAS(S)); 5 Sorby Adams Drive, Singapore 357691 (SAJC); Woodsville/Potong Pasir; Singapore
- 1.331278°N 103.865139°E

Information
- Established: 26 August 2006; 19 years ago
- School code: 5009(SAS(J)); 7015 (SAS(S)); 0804 (SAJC)
- Enrollment: approx. 5000
- Campuses: Woodsville & Potong Pasir
- Campus size: 13.5 ha
- School: St Andrew's School
- Website: SAS(J); SAS(S); SAJC

St Andrew's Village (abbreviation: SAV) is a 13.5 ha school complex located in the Central Region of Singapore. It was officially opened on 26 August 2006, with the ceremony being held at the 1000-seater Cultural Centre in the Junior College.

The Village consists of Woodsville Campus and Potong Pasir Campus, located on the east and west bank of the Kallang River respectively. Both campuses are linked to each other by the Jacob Ballas Bridge, forming the Village. It mainly houses the St Andrew's School (Junior), St Andrew's School (Secondary) and St Andrew's Junior College. In addition to these three schools, the Village also houses the Anglican Diocesan Office, the Ascension Kindergarten, three church buildings and a hostel.

== Woodsville Campus ==
Woodsville Campus is located along Francis Thomas Drive, which named after the politician Francis Thomas, on the east bank of Kallang River. It comprises St Andrew's School (Junior) (SAS(J)), St Andrew's School (Secondary) (SAS(S)), Ascension Kindergarten, Church of the Resurrection, Church of the Ascension, and the Diocese of Singapore.

Sport facilities can also be found in this campus, mainly to serve the student population. These include a rugby field, a hockey pitch, an Olympic-sized swimming pool and an indoor sports hall.

== Potong Pasir Campus ==
Potong Pasir Campus is located along Sorby Adams Drive, which was named after the late Reverend Reginald Keith Sorby Adams, on the west bank of Kallang River. It comprises St Andrew's Junior College (SAJC) and the Chapel of the Holy Spirit. The 1000-seater two-storey Cultural Centre is also located in this campus. Sports facilities in this campus include a 400m synthetic track, a synthetic rugby/football field, a gym (the former two at the Sports Gallery Area), a sheltered basketball court (next to the cafeteria) and rooftop tennis courts (on the fourth floor).

The 12-storey St Andrew's Hall (SA Hall) is also located in Potong Pasir Campus. It is a co-educational residence housing up to 600 students, and was officially opened on 25 August 2012. The Hall is under the management of the Board of Governors of St Andrew's Junior College and is also a member of the Anglican Diocese of Singapore.
