= Varvaro =

Varvaro is a surname of Italian origin, derived from the Greek bárbaros (Greek: βάρβαρος), the same root word for the term barbarian.

Notable individuals with the surname include:

- Anthony Varvaro (1984–2022), American professional baseball player and police officer
- Julia Varvaro (born 1996 or 1997), American civil servant

== See also ==
- Barbara (given name)
- Varvara (disambiguation)
