= Julia Varvaro =

American civil servant

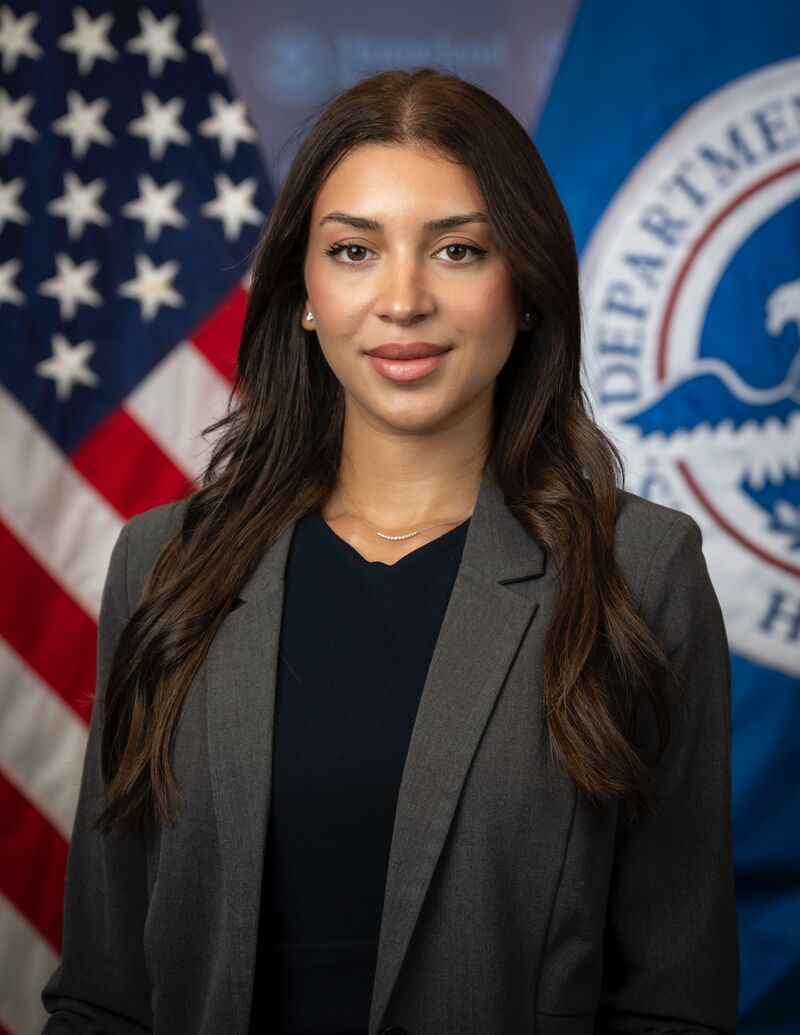
- Official portrait, 2025

Deputy Assistant Secretary for Counter Terrorism
- In office May 2025 – April 2026

Personal details
- Born: 1996 or 1997 (age 29–30)
- Education: St. John's University (BS, MPS, DPS)

Julia Varvaro (born 1996 or 1997) is an American civil servant, who served as Deputy Assistant Secretary for Counter Terrorism at the US Department of Homeland Security from 2025 to 2026. In April 2026, Varvaro was placed on administrative leave following an investigation launched against her spending and alleged drug use.

== Early life and education ==
Born in 1996 or 1997, Varvaro attended St. John's University, graduating with a BS in business in 2018, a Master of Professional Studies (MPS) in homeland security and criminal justice leadership in 2020, and a Doctor of Professional Studies in homeland security in 2024.

== Career ==
In May 2025, Varvaro was appointed Deputy Assistant Secretary for Counter Terrorism.

In April 2026, a formal complaint was filed against Varvaro by a former boyfriend alleging she had solicited thousands of dollars from sugar daddies and that she had an account on Seeking, a website known for facilitating such relationships. Varvaro denies the allegations, saying she was in an exclusive relationship while with her boyfriend. She was subsequently placed on administrative leave while under investigation by the DHS. In July 2026, she sued the former boyfriend in federal court for defamation.
