= Michael Palmer (politician) =

Singaporean lawyer and politician

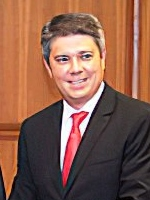
- Palmer in 2012

6th Speaker of the Parliament of Singapore
- In office 10 October 2011 – 12 December 2012
- Deputy: Charles Chong; Seah Kian Peng
- Preceded by: Abdullah Tarmugi
- Succeeded by: Halimah Yacob

Member of Parliament for Punggol East SMC
- In office 7 May 2011 – 12 December 2012
- Preceded by: Constituency established
- Succeeded by: Lee Li Lian

Member of Parliament for Pasir Ris–Punggol GRC
- In office 6 May 2006 – 18 April 2011
- Preceded by: PAP held
- Succeeded by: PAP held

Personal details
- Born: 14 July 1968 (age 58) Singapore
- Other political affiliations: People's Action Party (2006–2013)
- Spouse: Diana Palmer
- Children: 1
- Parent: Vernon Palmer (father)
- Education: University College London (LLB)

Michael Anthony Palmer (born 14 July 1968) is a Singaporean lawyer and former politician who served as Speaker of the Parliament of Singapore between 2011 and 2012. A former member of the governing People's Action Party (PAP), he was the Member of Parliament (MP) representing the Punggol East ward of Pasir Ris–Punggol Group Representation Constituency (GRC) between 2006 and 2011, and Punggol East Single Member Constituency (SMC) between 2011 and 2012.

Palmer announced his resignation as Speaker of Parliament, Member of Parliament for Punggol East SMC and a member of the PAP on 12 December 2012.

== Career ==
Palmer was called to the Singapore Bar in 1995 and joined the law firm Harry Elias Partnership as a legal consultant before becoming a partner in 1998.

In April 2013, Palmer left Harry Elias Partnership and joined the law firm Lawrence Quahe & Woo. The firm was renamed Quahe Woo & Palmer when he joined.

=== Political career ===
Palmer made his political debut in the 2006 general election as part of a five-member PAP team contesting in Pasir Ris–Punggol GRC and won.

Palmer served as Chairman of the Government Parliamentary Committee for Defence and Foreign Affairs from 2008 to 2011, and as Chairman of the Government Parliamentary Committee for Home Affairs and Law from 2011 until in resignation in 2012.

Palmer contested in Punggol East SMC during the 2011 general election and won. He was elected as the Member of Parliament (MP) for Punggol East SMC after defeating Lee Li Lian of the Workers' Party and Desmond Lim of the Singapore Democratic Alliance. Palmer was subsequently nominated by Prime Minister Lee Hsien Loong for the office of Speaker of Parliament, before being elected by the House on 10 October 2011.

==== Extramarital affair and resignation ====
Palmer announced his resignation as Speaker of Parliament, Member of Parliament for Punggol East SMC and a member of the PAP on 12 December 2012 due to an extra-marital affair with Laura Ong Hui Hoon, Constituency Director of the People's Association (PA) office in Pasir Ris–Punggol GRC. At a press conference, alongside Deputy Prime Minister Teo Chee Hean, Palmer admitted he had made "a grave mistake" and that it was "a serious error of judgment". He resigned "in order to avoid further embarrassment". The PA staff member concerned also resigned.

The PAP subsequently lost the by-elections in Punggol East SMC in January 2013 when Lee Li Lian of the Workers' Party—who Palmer had defeated in the 2011 general election, won the seat, defeating the PAP candidate Koh Poh Koon.

=== Other roles ===
Palmer was also Chairman of the National Police Cadet Corps (NPCC) Council. He was replaced by Assistant Commissioner Zuraidah as Covering Chairperson after the scandal.

== Education ==
Palmer attended St Andrew's Junior School, St Andrew's Secondary School and St Andrew's Junior College before graduating from the University College London in 1992 with a Bachelor of Laws with honours degree.

Parliament of Singapore
Preceded by Abdullah Tarmugi	Speaker of Parliament; 12 October 2011–12 December 2012	Succeeded by Charles Chong (acting); Halimah Yacob
