= St Andrew's Junior College =

College in Singapore founded 1978

- 圣安德烈初级学院; Maktab Rendah St Andrew's

Location
- 5 Sorby Adams Drive; Singapore 357691; Singapore
- 1.332551°N 103.863605°E

Information
- Type: Government-aided
- Motto: Up and On
- Religious affiliation: Anglican
- Established: 3 January 1978; 48 years ago
- Session: Single-session
- School code: 0804
- Principal: Tham Kine Thong
- Gender: Co-educational
- Enrollment: approx. 1600
- Campus: St Andrew's Village
- Campus size: 13.5 ha
- Houses: Romanis, Gomes, Hose, Loyfatt, Venn
- Color: Navy Blue White
- Mascot: Andrew (Tiger)
- Team name: Team SAJC
- Affiliations: Secondary Schools: Anglican High School; Christ Church Secondary School; Kuo Chuan Presbyterian Secondary School; Presbyterian High School; Saint Andrew's Secondary School; Saint Hilda's Secondary School; Saint Margaret's Secondary School
- Vision: Home of Servant Leaders who bring life to the Nations
- Identity: Saints
- Website: standrewsjc.moe.edu.sg

St Andrew's Junior College (SAJC) is a junior college in Singapore, offering two-year pre-university courses leading up to the Singapore-Cambridge GCE Advanced Level examination. It is an Anglican mission school, part of St Andrew's School. It is affiliated to schools under the Anglican Diocese of Singapore, as well as Kuo Chuan Presbyterian Secondary School and Presbyterian High School.

== History ==
St Andrew's Junior College (SAJC) has its origins in St Andrew's School, which was founded in 1862 by the Anglican Diocese of Singapore.

SAJC started as part of the Anglican church. The Lutheran and Presbyterian Churches also joined in the building project. Construction began in 1976 and was officially declared open in 1979, although students had been admitted since 1978.

It moved to Potong Pasir to form part of St Andrew's Village on 15 December 2005. The campus is now located at the former Secondary School site at 5 Sorby Adams Drive, Singapore 357691 (previously 55 Potong Pasir Avenue 1). St Andrew's Village was officially opened by the then Minister for Education Tharman Shanmugaratnam on 26th Aug 2006.

== Affiliations ==
St Andrew's Junior College is affiliated to the Anglican Diocese of Singapore, as well as all institutions affiliated to the Anglican Diocese of Singapore.

These institutions include, St Andrew's Secondary School, Anglican High School, Christ Church Secondary School, Kuo Chuan Presbyterian Secondary School, Presbyterian High School, St Hilda's Secondary School and St Margaret's Secondary School.

== School life ==
Students at the college are called "Saints". All the St Andrew's Schools shares the same motto, "Up and On", as well as the school colours of blue and white.

The former Crest of SAJC from 1978 to 1992

The former crest of St Andrew's Junior College made itself from that of SAS(S) and SAS(J). It bore the saltire and had "SAJC" in white letters on a red circle in the middle of the cross instead of the tiger head and crossed keys of the other schools. The crest was changed in 1993 to that of SASS.

There are five houses in SAJC, whose names match that of SAJS and SASS. They are Romanis, Gomes, Hose, LoyFatt, and Venn, all named after founding members of St Andrew's School.

The school falls under the Anglican Diocese of Singapore. The school has daily scripture readings and morning prayers conducted by teachers and students. There is a Chapel service held fortnightly led by the school chaplaincy from the Chapel of the Resurrection. Once a year, the school also observes Easter Week, finishing off with Easter Week St.ories, a concert held on school grounds with a partial goal of evangelical outreach to non-Christian students.

== Campus ==
The college is located at the Potong Pasir Campus, on the west bank of Kallang River. This campus is linked to the Woodsville Campus on the east bank (where SAJS and SASS is) via the Jacob Ballas Bridge, forming the 13.5 ha St Andrew's Village. Together, the three schools form St Andrew's School.

In 2012, a 12-storey hostel was added to the village, named St Andrew's Hall.

== Academic Information ==
St Andrew's Junior College offers both arts and science streams that leads to the Singapore-Cambridge GCE Advanced Level examination.

== Notable alumni ==
- Michael Palmer – former Member of Parliament for Punggol East Single Member Constituency and Speaker for Parliament.
- Kishore Mahbubani – former President of the UN Security Council and incumbent Dean of the Lee Kuan Yew School of Public Policy.
- Stefanie Sun – Singaporean singer
- JJ Lin – Singaporean singer
- Hong Jun Yang – Singaporean singer
- Annette Lee - Actress, Writer, Singer-Songwriter
- Jasmine Sokko – Singaporean electronic music singer-songwriter and producer
- Priscilla Krempl – Principal from 1996 to 2001

== See also ==
- Education in Singapore
