= AAC Technologies =

Chinese technology organization

- Native name: 瑞聲科技控股有限公司
- Romanized name: ruìshēng kējì kònggǔ yǒuxiàn gōngsī
- Type: listed
- Traded as: SEHK: 2018; Hang Seng Index component; OTCBB:AACAY
- Industry: acoustics manufacturing
- Founded: 1993
- Founder: Pan Zheng-min; Wu Chun-yuan
- Headquarters: Hongkong, People's Republic of China
- Area served: Worldwide
- Key people: Koh Boon Hwee (Chairman)

Chinese name
- Simplified Chinese: 瑞声科技控股有限公司
- Traditional Chinese: 瑞聲科技控股有限公司
Transcriptions
Standard Mandarin
- Hanyu Pinyin: ruì shēng kē jì kòng gǔ yǒu xiàn gōng sī

Chinese short name
- Simplified Chinese: 瑞声科技
- Traditional Chinese: 瑞聲科技
Transcriptions

second alternative short name
- Simplified Chinese: 瑞声
- Traditional Chinese: 瑞聲
Transcriptions
- Website: aactechnologies.com

AAC Technologies Holdings, Inc. (simplified Chinese: 瑞声科技控股有限公司; traditional Chinese: 瑞聲科技控股有限公司), or AAC Technologies in short form, is a civilian-run enterprise. It engages in the design, development, manufacture and distribution of miniaturized components.

AAC Technologies designs, develops and manufactures a broad range of miniaturized components that include speakers, receivers and microphones in the acoustic segment. It produces these components for mobile devices such as smartphones, tablets, wearables, ultrabooks, notebooks and e-readers. It also produces optics (camera lenses, smartglasses), haptic sensors, semiconductors, folding phone hinges, iPhone 17 Pro vapour chambers, 5G antennas, and wireless charging coils.

AAC Technologies is one of the main suppliers of Apple Inc. It also supplies Chinese smartphone makers such as Huawei.
