= Brandon Wade =

American businessman (born 1970)

- Born: July 16, 1970 (age 56); Singapore
- Other names: Brandon Wey, Lead Wey
- Occupations: Businessman, entrepreneur
- Known for: InfoStream Group; Seeking.com
- Website: askbrandonwade.com

Brandon Wade (born Lead Wey, 16 July 1970) is an American businessman who is the founder and chief executive officer of InfoStream Group, an online dating company.

== Early life ==
Born in Singapore to ethnic Chinese parents, Wade was raised in what he describes as a "Tiger Mom–type of upbringing" consisting of studying and not much else. While growing up in Singapore, Wade attended Saint Andrew's Secondary School and Hwa Chong Junior College.

In 1993, Wade graduated from Massachusetts Institute of Technology (MIT), where he received a Bachelor of Science in electrical engineering on an Overseas Merit Scholarship awarded by Singapore's Public Service Commission. Upon graduating in 1993, Wade opted to stay in the United States, breaking his contractual obligation to return to Singapore and forcing his parents to pay about $300,000 in damages. Wade then enrolled in the MIT Sloan School of Management, where he graduated with a Master of Business Administration in 1995.

== Career ==
After completing his MBA, he moved to New York City to work for technology consultants Booz Allen. He later joined General Electric as a technology infrastructure manager.

In 2006, Wade founded Seeking.com and served as CEO of the company from 2006 to 2022, and then rejoined the company as CEO in 2024.

Wade is the author of two books titled Seeking Arrangement: The Definitive Guide to Sugar Daddy and Mutually Beneficial Relationships and Connecting with the IN Crowd: How to Network, Hang Out, and Play with Millionaires Online.

In a 2014 essay for CNN titled "Dating website founder says love doesn't exist", Wade wrote, "Love is a concept invented by poor people."

=== Dating websites ===
In 2006, Wade founded the sugar dating website Seeking.com. In 2007, Wade launched a companion dating site WhatsYourPrice.com, a dating website where members bid for dates in an online auction environment. In May 2012 he launched MissTravel.com, which pairs 'generous' travelers with 'attractive' travelers who would love the opportunity to travel the world for free. And in May 2015, Wade launched OpenMinded.com, a dating website that caters to those who are monogamish. He further states the website caters to those looking to engage in 'ethical cheating'.
