= Woffles Wu =

Singaporean plastic surgeon

Dr. Woffles Wu Tze Liang FRCS, FAMS
- Born: 1960 (age 65–66); Singapore
- Education: National University of Singapore
- Occupation: Plastic surgeon
- Years active: 1980s–present
- Known for: Making developments and creating new inventions in plastic surgery; hosting art exhibitions; volunteer work; involvement and making appearances in the Singapore media
- Spouse: (wife)
- Children: Ollie Wu (son), (daughter)
- Relatives: Ong Teng Cheong (maternal uncle); Tina Tan-Leo (cousin)
- Medical career
- Profession: Surgery
- Field: Plastic surgery
- Military career
- Allegiance: Singapore
- Branch: Singapore Army
- Service years: 1978–1987
- Rank: Captain
- Unit: HQ 3rd Division

Dr. Woffles Wu Tze Liang (simplified Chinese: 吴志良; traditional Chinese: 吳志良; pinyin: Wú Zhìliáng; born 1960), FRCS, FAMS, is a Singaporean plastic surgeon.

== Early life ==
Wu was born in Singapore but he grew up in London, UK His mother, a beautician who later became a lawyer, affectionately nicknamed him "Woffles", after a rabbit from the novel The Magic Faraway Tree by Enid Blyton, and he grew to accept this nickname. In his childhood, he helped his mother with manicures, pedicures and make-up application.

At the age of 12, Wu returned to Singapore and attended Saint Andrew's School. He just passed the Primary School Leaving Examination (PSLE) and barely scraped through the Singapore-Cambridge GCE Ordinary Level examinations because he nearly failed his second language.

Wu served compulsory military service (National Service) from December 1978 to July 1987, disrupting for six years in between to study medicine. He was a medical officer in the 3rd Division of the Singapore Army and held the rank of Captain.

== Career ==
Wu obtained his MBBS degree from the National University of Singapore (NUS) in the 1980s while working on paediatrics at the Toa Payoh Hospital (now part of the Changi General Hospital). He moved to the Singapore General Hospital in 1989 and worked as a plastic surgeon for 12 years before setting up his own private practice at Camden Medical Centre in Singapore.

Wu is also a Fellow of the Royal College of Surgeons of Edinburgh and the Academy of Medicine, Singapore. In 1987, he worked under his mentor and friend, Prof. ST Lee, a cleft palate surgeon. Three years later, Wu won the Young Surgeon of the Year Award for his research on nasal anatomy. In the same year, he was awarded the SEAMIC scholarship that allowed him to visit and study under other reconstructive and aesthetic surgeons in Thailand, the Philippines and Japan.

Wu is known for reinventing and promoting the concept of Non Surgical Facial Rejuvenation (NSFR), through a combination of BOTOX, fillers, IPL photorejuvenation, and his personal invention, the 'Woffles Lift'. He is also an advanced BOTOX trainer in the Asia Pacific region and is constantly training physicians worldwide on his techniques. Wu has also refined the art of breast augmentation surgery by introducing a technique, developed by him, called the 'WW Stealth (Invisible) Incision'.

== Other interests ==
Apart from his medical career, Wu has also appeared many times on Singaporean television sitcoms and dramas. He was a co-producer of the 2006 Singaporean film Singapore Dreaming.

Wu's other hobbies include sports and the arts. He was a national level ten-pin bowler in his teenage years before switching to billiards and snooker, where he represented Singapore on an international level between 1984 and 1988. He is also interested in painting and sculpting, inspired by his grandfather, who was a Chinese painter. He collects Chinese pop art, such as paintings of Mao Zedong. He has also exhibited his style of psychoerotic paintings in Taiwan and Singapore, and has used his art to raise money for charity.

Wu also does volunteer work, repairing cleft lips in Myanmar, Java and West Timor.

== Personal life ==
Wu is married and has a son and a daughter. He lives in Bishan with his wife and his daughter in a rented house, two doors away from a four-bedroom bungalow (his mother, his son and a maid live there), where his family have been living since 1951.

Wu's mother is a cousin of Ong Teng Cheong, the fifth President of Singapore. His cousin, Karen Woo, a British physician and aid worker, was killed by Taliban gunmen in Afghanistan in August 2010. Wu also counts Tina Tan-Leo, the founder of the fashion label Alldressedup and director and shareholder of Fashion International, as his cousin. His friends include musician Dick Lee and theatre director and filmmaker Glen Goei.

== Speeding offence incident ==
In November 2006, Wu's car was involved in a speeding offence, travelling at more than 90 km/h on a road where the speed limit was 60 km/h. He was charged with abetting another person in providing misleading information to the police about who was driving the car at that time. In June 2012, he was fined S$1,000. The charge and sentence were the subject of some public discussion. The Attorney General's Chambers explained that both were in accordance with the law. In addition, Wu's medical license was suspended for 4 months in early 2014.
