= Koh Boon Hwee =

Singaporean businessman

Koh Boon Hwee DUBC
- Born: 17 November 1950 (age 75)
- Education: Saint Andrew's School Imperial College of Science and Technology University of London Harvard Business School
- Occupations: Chairman, Yeo Hiap Seng; Chairman, Far East Orchard; Chairman, AAC Technologies

Koh Boon Hwee DUBC (Chinese: 许文辉; born 1950) is a Singaporean businessman.

== Education ==
Koh was educated at Saint Andrew's School, Singapore. He went on to receive a first class honours degree in mechanical engineering from the Imperial College of Science and Technology, University of London, and an MBA (Distinction) from the Harvard Business School.

== Career ==
Koh was appointed Chairman of the Singapore Telecom Group in 1986 and then joined the Singapore Airlines board in March 2001.

He was Chairman of the SIA Engineering Company; a Director of Agilent Technologies Inc, Four Soft Ltd and Norelco UMS Holdings Limited; Executive Director of MediaRing Limited and Tech Group Asia Limited. He is on the boards of Temasek Holdings (Private) Limited, AAC Acoustic Technologies Holdings Ltd and Infiniti Solutions Private Limited. He is also a Council Member of the Singapore Business Federation.

On 1 January 2006, Koh became chairman of DBS Bank. He joined DBS as a director on 15 June 2005. He stepped down on 30 April 2010, replaced by Peter Seah.
