= Cherian George =

Singaporean journalism professor

Cherian George is a Singaporean academic, currently a professor of Media Studies at Hong Kong Baptist University.

== Early life and education ==
Cherian George studied at Saint Andrew's School, Singapore, and Hwa Chong Junior College for his pre-university education. He then graduated from the University of Cambridge with a bachelor's degree in social and political sciences. Thereafter, he attained his master's degree from Columbia University's School of Journalism.

== Journalism career ==
Cherian George worked as a journalist at The Straits Times for a decade, of which he was its art and photo editor for three years. He was also assigned to the paper's political desk during his initial years there. He then went to Stanford University where he was awarded Doctor of Philosophy in communications. During his time with the paper, he had established himself as a critic of the Singapore government and the nation's politics, and was mentioned in a quote alongside Catherine Lim (Note: Lim wrote a commentary criticising Singapore prime minister Goh Chok Tong) by Lee Kuan Yew.

== Academic career ==
In 2004, Cherian George became a faculty member at Nanyang Technological University's Wee Kim Wee School of Communication and Information. In 2009, he was promoted from assistant professor to associate professor. However, the promotion came without tenure. In 2010, he was not reappointed as the head of journalism department in the faculty, as it was blocked by the university. He was however awarded a teaching excellence award from NTU. In 2012, he was asked to resubmit his tenure application, to which he attached the assessment from his 2009 promotion and tenure application. The assessments was redacted without his knowledge, and the reapplication failed.

In 2013, there was a debate over academic freedom in Singapore when Cherian George, an outspoken academic at the Wee Kim Wee School of Communications who had publicly criticised Singapore's system of media control and its ruling People's Action Party, did not get tenured. Although George had been recommended for tenure by the Wee Kim Wee School, his application was turned down by a university-level committee which included representatives from the Government of Singapore. One of the reviewers for the tenure case, Cardiff University's Karin Wahl-Jorgensen, expressed outrage at NTU's decision, and George's thesis advisor, Stanford University's Theodore Glasser, raised doubts about "NTU's reputation as a university of international standing" and "NTU's commitment to academic freedom". Despite a petition against the tenure decision by students at the Wee Kim Wee School, George's appeal against the tenure decision was subsequently rejected by the university.

In August 2014, George took up the post of vice professor at Hong Kong Baptist University.

In 2015, NTU president Bertil Andersson, in an interview with Times Higher Education, rejection of George's tenure application was based on academic decisions and not political. However, George rebutted the comments as it implied that he left the university as he could not meet its academic standards. However, he was "given political reasons for the university's decisions" with respect to the rejection of his 2009 tenure application.

In 2020, after the book which he wrote with Donald Low, PAP v PAP: the party's struggle to adapt to a changing Singapore was published, both him and Low were replaced panellists for a public discourse webinar hosted by a National University of Singapore (NUS) alumni group at the eleventh hour. The last minute replacement was received negatively by various political commentators and personalities.

In 2021, his book Red Lines: Political Cartoons and the Struggle against Censorship was banned in Singapore due to the reproductions of materials deemed offensive to religions such as Charlie Hebdo's 2012 cartoons depicting Muhammad, and denigratory images of Jesus Christ and Hindu deities. The ban was made under the Undesirable Publications Act. Minister for Communications & Information Josephine Teo would later reiterate in the Parliament that the ban was made in consideration solely on giving offence to religious feelings, and was not politically driven. The A.V. Club's Caitlin Rosberg reviewed the book, gave it a D− rating, and had criticised it as "a bad fit for many classrooms and almost all casual readers".

== Personal life ==
Cherian George is married to Zuraidah Ibrahim, who was a deputy editor at The Straits Times before working at South China Morning Post, managing its international desk before eventually becoming its managing editor. Zuraidah is a sibling of Yaacob Ibrahim, a former Singaporean politician who had held various ministry portfolios in the Singapore government.

== Bibliography ==
Selected works :

- George, Cherian (2000). Singapore : the air-conditioned nation : essays on the politics of comfort and control, 1990-2000. Singapore: Landmark Books. ISBN 981-3065-46-X. OCLC 45891380.
- George, Cherian (2006). Contentious journalism and the Internet : toward democratic discourse in Malaysia and Singapore. Seattle: University of Washington Press. ISBN 0-295-98578-X. OCLC 61361601.
- George, Cherian (2017). Hate spin : the manufacture of religious offense and its threat to democracy. Cambridge, Massachusetts. ISBN 978-0-262-33608-6. OCLC 992463091.
- George, Cherian (2020). PAP v PAP : the party's struggle to adapt to a changing Singapore. Donald Low. Singapore. ISBN 978-981-14-7658-7. OCLC 1196822675.
- George, Cherian (2020). Air-conditioned nation revisited : essays on Singapore politics. Singapore. ISBN 978-981-14-4984-0. OCLC 1184458509.
- George, Cherian; Liew, Sonny (2021). Red Lines: Political Cartoons and the Struggle against Censorship. MIT Press. ISBN 978-0-262-36691-5.
