= Presbyterian High School =

- 长老会中学 / 長老會中學; Sekolah Tinggi Presbyterian

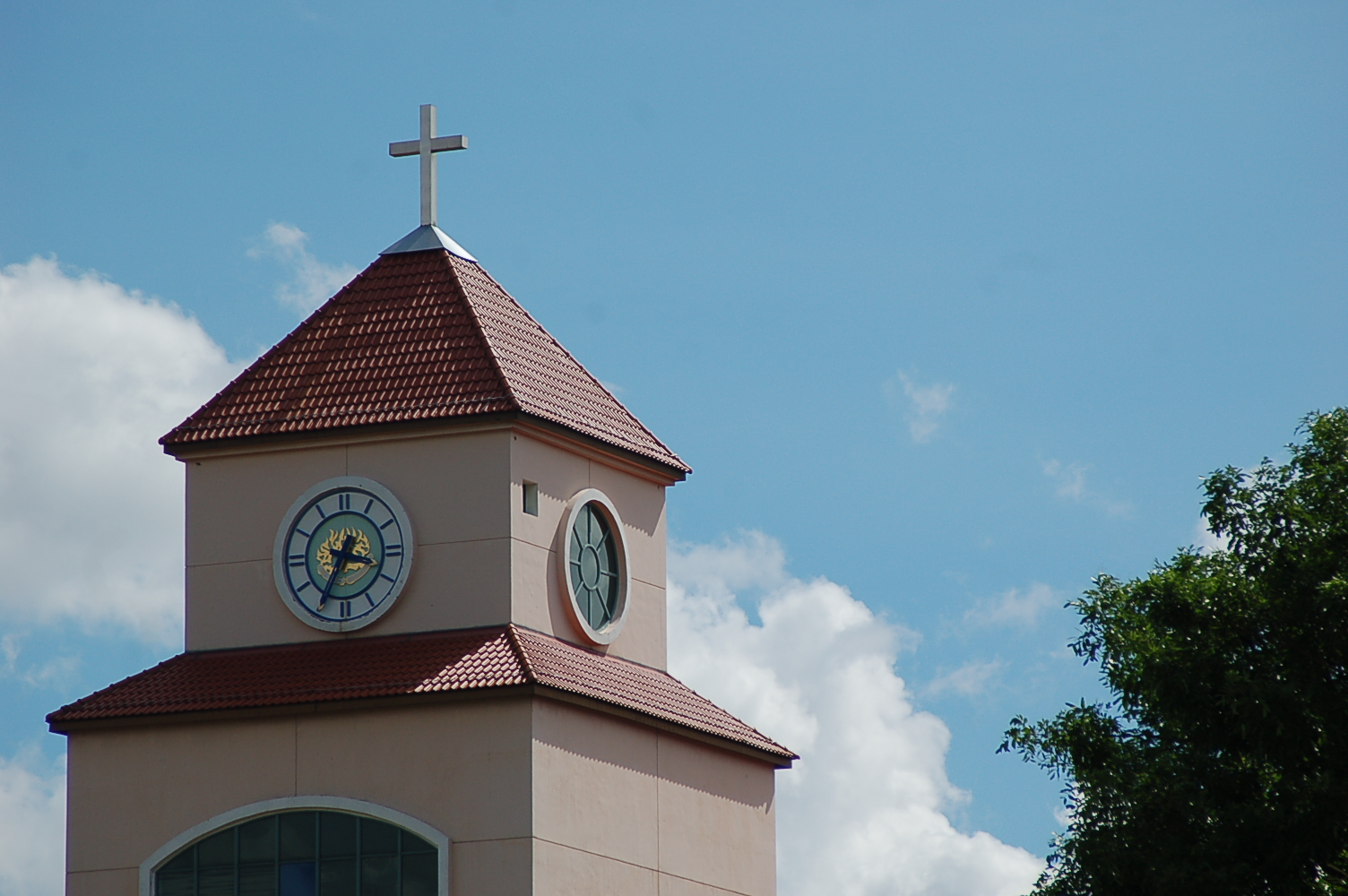
- The Presbyterian High School clock tower

Location
- 5209 Ang Mo Kio Avenue 6 Singapore 569845; Yio Chu Kang; Singapore; 1°22′58.90″N 103°50′33.87″E

Information
- Former name: Li Sun High
- Type: Government-aided; Co-educational
- Motto: Nec tamen consumebatur "Aflame for Truth" (Yet it was not consumed)
- Religious affiliation: Presbyterian
- Established: 4 January 1965; 61 years ago
- Session: Single Session
- School code: 7308
- Chairman: Alexander Lee
- Principal: Angeline Chan Hui Miin
- Enrolment: approx. 1300
- Colour: Navy Blue White
- Song: "Behold the Burning Bush"
- Affiliations: Saint Andrew's Junior College
- Website: presbyterian.moe.edu.sg

Presbyterian High School is a co-educational government-aided Presbyterian secondary school in Ang Mo Kio, Singapore. It is located directly opposite Yio Chu Kang MRT station.

== History ==
=== Li Sun High School ===
In 1960, under the vision and conviction of founding father, Reverend Alan S. Moore Anderson, the Presbyterian Synod passed the resolution to start a God-centred institution of learning and Li Sun High School was thus founded in 1965 at Upper Serangoon Road. Li Sun High shared premises with Ming Sin Primary School and was home to 150 students. It was a Chinese-language school but switched to English in 1981 to bring it into line with Singapore's Ministry of Education policies.

=== Renamed as Presbyterian High School ===
In 1978, Li Sun High School came under the management of Bethel Presbyterian Church. In 1981, the Synod approved the name change to Presbyterian High School and the school moved to Ang Mo Kio in 1983.

Before 2002, PHS occupied a small plot of land located across the road from the Yio Chu Kang MRT station, and shared a field with the neighbouring Li Hua Primary School and Ang Mo Kio North Primary School, even though PHS herself shared no affiliations with either of these. Today, the school stands on 3 hectares of land and is home to over 1,400 students and staff. The new school includes a hall that can accommodate the entire school population, well-equipped computer laboratories and IT-enabled classrooms, an Indoor Sports Stadium consisting of three levels of facilities such as a basketball court, a volleyball court and various rooms for co-curricular activities (CCAs) for students studying the subject, as well as the National Education Stairwell and the Olive Garden.

In 2007, PHS was chosen as one of the seven schools to participate in the Sino-Singapore Cultural Exchange Programme in 2007 as well as again in 2016. In the same year, the school accepted the invitation by the ASEAN-Japan Friendship Association for the 21st Century (SAJAFA-21) to participate in the Miyazaki-Singapore Friendship Exchange Programme.

=== Redevelopment ===
In 1997, a proposal to rebuild the school was accepted by the Management Board and the Presbyterian Synod, and in 1999 the school was granted MOE's approval for total rebuilding.

In 2002 the school's redevelopment was complete, and students moved into the new buildings. A Homecoming March ceremony was held involving past and present students. The new school campus has an air-conditioned hall and a clock tower, paid for by the alumni and money raised over the years. It has a school field made from an empty plot of land nearby. The plot of land has been replaced by artificial turf.

== School identity and culture ==
=== School crest ===
The crest is topped by two waves signifying the continuous growth and development of the School from its founding as Li Sun High School to the present Presbyterian High School. The dove with a stalk of olive leaves depicts the development of the spiritual and moral life in the School and guides us in our education which is represented by the Book. The cross represents faith in God. The burning bush with its motto "Aflame for Truth", which is also the motto of Kuo Chuan Presbyterian Secondary School, signifies that the school is part of the community of Christians in Presbyterian Churches all over the world. The Latin phrase underneath the bush Nec tamen consumebatur refers to the story of the burning bush and the worldwide Presbyterian church. The white and blue background represents the school colours: white symbolises a quest for truth while blue stands for a pursuit of excellence. The current crest dates back to 1994.

Presbyterian High School celebrated its 61st anniversary in 2026.

=== School discipline ===
PHS is designed to appeal to parents wishing their sons and daughters to benefit from a tightly structured and very strict school setting in the service of God. The rules for discipline and the code of conduct lay down rigorous behavioural standards, noting that truancy, vandalism, smoking and other serious offences are severely punished.

== Affiliations ==
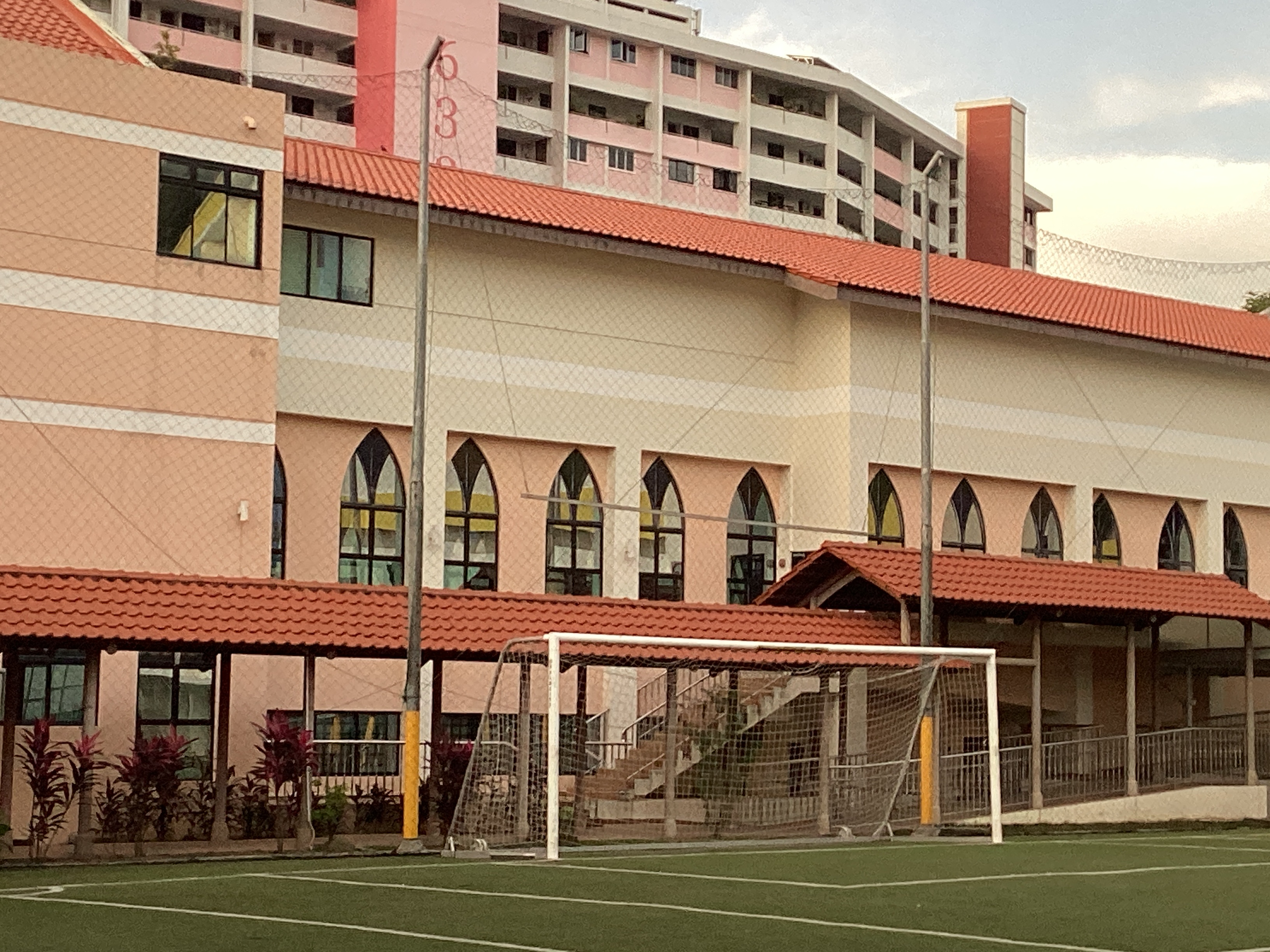
A side view of the affiliated church, Ang Mo Kio Presbyterian Church.

Presbyterian High School has affiliations with Pei Hwa Presbyterian Primary School, Kuo Chuan Presbyterian Primary School, Kuo Chuan Presbyterian Secondary School, Saint Andrew's Junior College, Ang Mo Kio Presbyterian Church and Bethel Presbyterian Church.

== Co-curricular activities ==
Presbyterian High School has been awarded the Sustained Achievement Award for Uniformed Group for 8 years. In 2005, it was ascribed the Direct Schools Admissions (DSA) for Uniformed Group. In 2007, PHS received its first Sustained Achievement Award for Sports. It was the only school in Singapore with a second DSA through Volleyball. In the 2015 SYF, all of the Performing Arts groups attained the Distinction award, with the Symphonic Band continuing to achieve Distinction in the 2017 SYF.
