= Harry Elias =

Singaporean lawyer (1937–2020)

- Born: 4 May 1937; Singapore
- Died: 26 August 2020 (aged 83); Singapore
- Occupation: Lawyer

Harry Elias (4 May 1937 – 26 August 2020) was a Singaporean veteran lawyer and Senior Counsel. One of Singapore's best litigation lawyers, he was made a Senior Counsel in 1997.

Elias was instrumental in founding the Criminal Legal Aid Scheme, and also founded the eponymous firm, Harry Elias Partnership LLP.

Elias died after a long illness on 26 August 2020 at the age of 83.
