= Kishore Mahbubani =

Singaporean academic, diplomat and geopolitical consultant

Kishore Mahbubani PPA
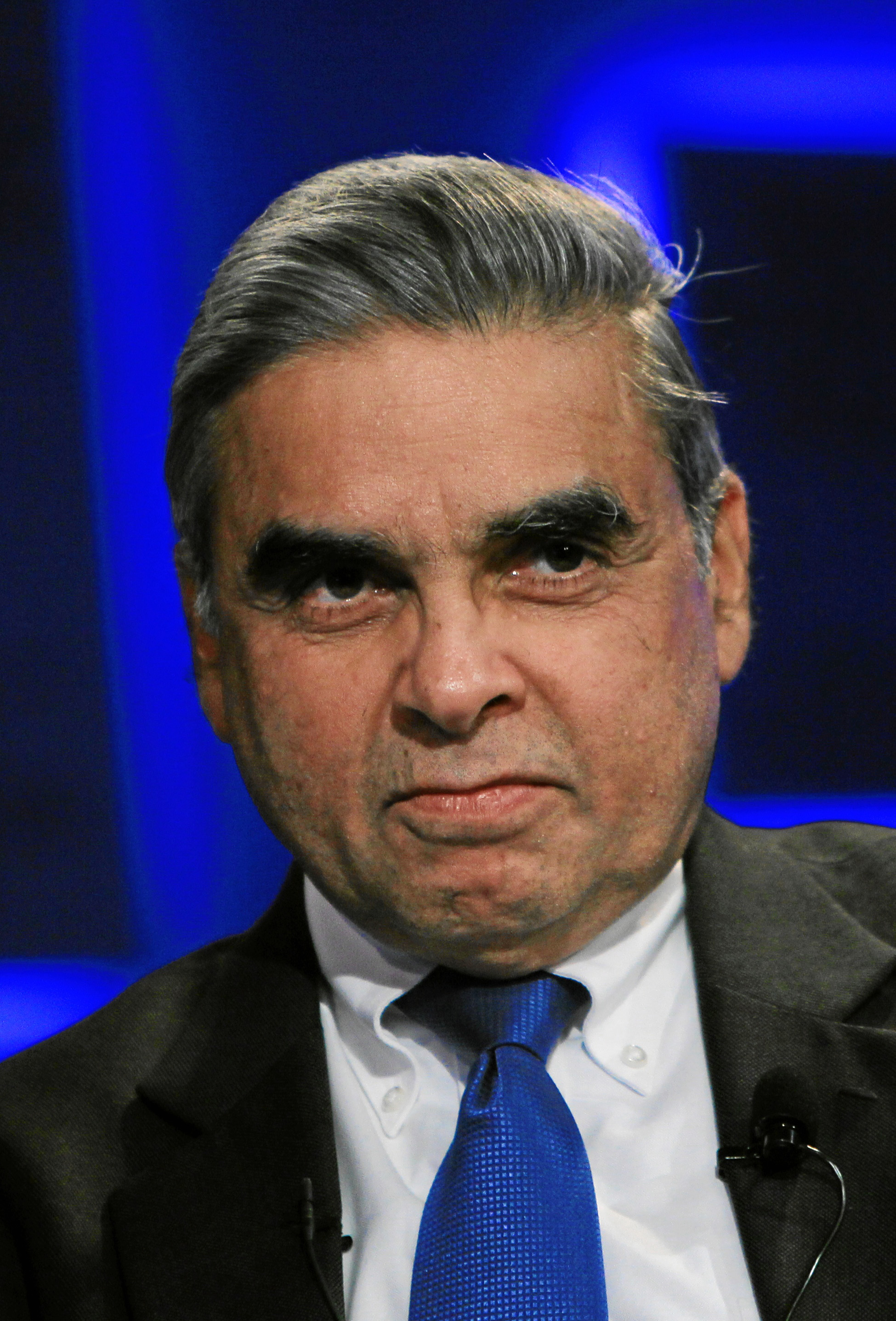
- Mahbubani in 2012

President of the United Nations Security Council
- In office January 2001 – May 2002
- Preceded by: Sergey Lavrov
- Succeeded by: Habib Ben Yahia

Singapore Permanent Representative to the United Nations
- In office 1998–2004
- President: Ong Teng Cheong; S. R. Nathan
- In office 1984–1989
- President: Devan Nair; Wee Kim Wee

Personal details
- Born: Kishore Mahbubani; 24 October 1948 (age 78) Colony of Singapore
- Spouses: Gretchen Gustafson (m. 1975, divorced) Anne King Markey (m. 1985)
- Children: 3
- Education: National University of Singapore (BA); Dalhousie University (MA); Harvard University
- Occupation: Diplomat; academic
- Website: mahbubani.net

Kishore Mahbubani PPA (born 24 October 1948) is a Singaporean diplomat and geopolitical consultant who served as Singapore Permanent Representative to the United Nations between 1984 and 1989, and again between 1998 and 2004, and President of the United Nations Security Council between 2001 and 2002.

After stepping down, he remained serving as a senior advisor at the National University of Singapore while engaging in a nine-month sabbatical at various universities, including Harvard University's Ash Center for Democratic Governance and Innovation. He is currently a Distinguished Fellow at the Asia Research Institute. In 2019, Mahbubani was elected as a member of the American Academy of Arts and Sciences.

Between 2004 and 2017, he served as Dean of the Lee Kuan Yew School of Public Policy at the National University of Singapore.

== Early life and education ==
Mahbubani was born in Singapore to a Sindhi-speaking Hindu family who were displaced from Sindh province ( modern-day Sindh, Pakistan) during the Partition of British India.

He attended Tanjong Katong Technical School and St. Andrew's School before he was awarded the President's Scholarship in 1967 to study at the University of Singapore (now the National University of Singapore), where he graduated in 1971 with a Bachelor of Arts with first class honours degree in philosophy.

He subsequently went on to complete a Master of Arts degree in philosophy at Dalhousie University in 1976.

Mahbubani was conferred an honorary Doctor of Philosophy from Dalhousie University in 1995.

== Career ==
=== Public service ===
After his graduation in 1971, Mahbubani joined the Ministry of Foreign Affairs (MFA) as a foreign service officer. His earlier postings included Cambodia, Malaysia and the United States. From 1993 to 1998, he held the position of Permanent Secretary at MFA. Later, he served as Singapore's Permanent Representative to the United Nations. In that role, he served as President of the United Nations Security Council in January 2001 and May 2002.

=== Academic career ===
Mahbubani's academic career began when he was appointed as the Dean of the Lee Kuan Yew School of Public Policy, National University of Singapore. He is also a Professor in the Practice of Public Policy. In 2017, he stepped down as Dean. His term as Dean was also marked by controversies, most notably when one of the school's senior academics, Dr Huang Jing, was identified as "an agent of influence of a foreign country" by the Government and expelled.
Several months prior to his resignation, he also drew criticism from Law Minister K Shanmugam and senior diplomats including Ambassador at Large Bilahari Kausikan for one of his commentaries that was published in the Straits Times.
In addition, he was a fellow at the Center for International Affairs at Harvard University in 1991–92. He currently also serves on the board of the International Advisory Council at Bocconi.

In October 2024, African School of Governance Foundation (ASGF) appointed him a member of the Governing Board of the newly established African School of Governance (ASG) based in Kigali, Rwanda.

=== Author ===
Mahbubani is best known outside Singapore for his books Can Asians Think?, Beyond The Age of Innocence: Rebuilding Trust between America and the World, The New Asian Hemisphere: The Irresistible Shift of Global Power to the East and Has China Won?. His latest book, Living the Asian Century: An Undiplomatic Memoir, was published in 2024.

His articles have appeared in newspapers such as Foreign Affairs, Foreign Policy, the Washington Quarterly, Survival, American Interest, the National Interest, Time, Newsweek, the Financial Times and the New York Times. Mahbubani also writes regularly for Singapore's The Straits Times. In the lead up to Singapore's 50th anniversary of independence, he began a series on "big ideas" that he hoped would help Singapore succeed in the following half-century.

== Board memberships ==
Mahbubani continues to serve in boards and councils of several institutions in Singapore, Europe and North America, including the Yale President's Council on International Activities, Association of Professional Schools of International Affairs, Indian Prime Minister's Global Advisory Council, Bocconi University's International Advisory Committee, World Economic Forum's Global Agenda Council on China, and Lee Kuan Yew World City Prize's nominating committee.

Mahbubani also spoke as part of Asian Institute of Finance's Distinguished Speaker Series in 2015 with the title "Can ASEAN re-invent itself?" to over hundreds of financial institution practitioners in Kuala Lumpur.

In 2019, Mahbubani was elected a member of the American Academy of Arts and Sciences.

Mahbubani is a member of the Executive Advisory Board of the WORLD.MINDS Foundation, where he engages in dialogue on geopolitics, multilateralism, and global governance.

== Honours ==
- Public Administration Medal (Gold) (1998)

Mahbubani was conferred the Public Administration Medal (Gold) by the Singapore government in 1998. The Foreign Policy Association Medal was awarded to him in New York in June 2004 with the following opening words in the citation: "A gifted diplomat, a student of history and philosophy, a provocative writer and an intuitive thinker". Mahbubani was also listed as one of the top 100 public intellectuals in the world by Foreign Policy and Prospect magazines in September 2005, and included in the March 2009 Financial Times list of Top 50 individuals who would shape the debate on the future of capitalism. Mahbubani was selected as one of Foreign Policy Top 100 Global Thinkers in 2010 and 2011 and one of Prospects top 50 world thinkers in 2014.

The secondary school library of the Tampines campus of the United World College of South East Asia (UWCSEA) is named after Mahbubani. He is also a former chair of the UWCSEA foundation.

== Positions ==
=== China ===
In his books, which are intended for a more extensive readership, the author principally analyses the interactions between Europe, Asia and North America. In accordance with Mahbubani's argument, the economic ascendance of Asia (notably China) signifies the necessity for other nations to embrace diverse social and political frameworks to avert substantial discord. It is evident that certain European nations have distanced themselves from imperialist and hegemonic claims since the conclusion of the colonial era and the Second World War. This shift in perspective has been observed by Mahbubani, who holds a favourable outlook on European-Asian relations, particularly in light of this historical development.

He identifies, though, a heightened potential for conflict in North American-Asian relations, particularly between the USA and China. Mahbubani (2023) posits that the moralising and condescending mindset of the United States and its ambitions to assert US hegemony in the world will significantly hinder the US's ability to cooperate with China and, more broadly, with all of Asia. According to Mahbubani, this phenomenon gives rise not only to global political tensions, but also to social tensions, because for a considerable number of individuals residing outside the United States, the US self-portrayal as a moralizer is perceived as "incredibly bizarre and hypocritical" in the face of the country's extremely aggressive foreign policy. In this particular context, the author's standpoint is that a considerable number of European governments continue to exhibit a degree of subservience towards the United States, as opposed to the pursuit of their own national interests and agendas.

=== Democracy ===
Mahbubani is committed to democracy as a goal for China as well, but sees differing views on the right path and the timeframe. The Russian population suffered from the rapid democratization process. "When Russia became democratic almost overnight, the economy shrank dramatically; life expectancy fell, and the infant mortality rate initially rose significantly. Therefore, the Chinese population is convinced that it would be better to embark on a slow transition process toward democratization." The United States also proclaimed its concept of the equality of all people during its civil war in the 19th century, "yet it took them almost 100 years to finally banish slavery. And it took 150 years of American democratization history before women were allowed to vote." It is hard to find a process in history that took less than 200 years to establish a functioning democracy. "If China could achieve this in half the time, that would already be a miracle."

He demands that the West stop trying to simply export democracy to the rest of the world.

This is the lesson we learned from the Iraq War: that an army of Christian-socialized soldiers landing on the soil of an Islamic country cannot sow the seeds of democracy without ending in complete disaster. We should completely reject this idea that democracy can simply be exported and imposed by the military of a superpower.

=== International institutions ===
Mahbubani sees the dominance of the West, and especially the US, in the world order, with 60% Western control of the UN Security Council and 100% control of the IMF and World Bank. "Another irony is that the world's most democratic countries are responsible for the democratic deficit that harms the most important international organizations." Western democracies are programmed to sacrifice global needs in favor of national interests.

It is therefore high time that the West recognizes that it is responsible for the critical bottleneck in the reform of the world order. Any Western analysis of the state of the world order should be based on the assumption that the problem is not with "others," but with "us." The big question for the world is: When will the West transform from a problem into a solution?

=== EU ===
In 2025, Mahbubani published an article in Foreign Policy titled "It's Time for Europe to Do the Unthinkable." He argued that the EU should take three unthinkable actions.

1. An EU with 5% military spending is equal to the USA and should accordingly make its own policies, following the same geopolitical principles as the USA.

In contrast, Europe's persistent adherence to NATO after Trump's provocative actions gives the impression of licking the boots that kick in its face.

2. The EU would need to reach a strategic compromise with Russia. In the long term, after strategic trust between Russia and a geopolitically autonomous Europe has been restored, Mahbubani sees the possibility that Ukraine could gradually serve as a bridge between the EU and Russia rather than remaining a constant bone of contention.

3. China could help the EU, through a strategic agreement, address its real long-term geopolitical problem, which Mahbuani sees as demographic growth in Africa. "To maintain a Europe governed by moderate parties, any foreign investment in Africa that creates jobs and retains local people should be welcomed. But instead, Europe is shooting itself in the foot by criticizing and blocking China's investments in Africa."

Two thousand years of geopolitics has taught us a simple and obvious lesson: All great powers will put their own interests first and, if necessary, sacrifice the interests of their allies. Trump is behaving like a rational geopolitical actor in putting what he perceives to be his country's interests first. Europe shouldn't just criticize Trump—instead, it should emulate him. It should carry out the currently unthinkable option: Declare that henceforth it will be a strategically autonomous actor on the world stage that will put its own interests first. Trump may finally show some respect for Europe if it does that.

As early as 2020, Mahbubani presented his thesis that the EU only has a geopolitical chance as long as China pursues the same interests. Therefore, it must assert its own interests more forcefully vis-à-vis the US.

The EU ambassador in Washington should now work on a declaration that the EU and the US will also "preserve and defend multilateralism, with the United Nations, the WTO, and the WHO at its core." If Europe could achieve this, the end result could be a safer, more reliable, and more stable world—to the benefit of the people of Europe and around the globe. .

=== Human Rights ===
Mahbubani criticises Western human rights campaigns for putting the cart before the horse, for double standards and for disregarding preparation, context and essential preconditions. He believes that Western-initiated human rights campaigns prioritise civil liberties over civil order and economic development. He suggests that a high level of human rights is achieved at the end of a process that includes economic development and the development of a middle class. Mahbubani argues that when human rights campaigns are driven by national governments, they are often driven by national interests, leading to inconsistencies and double standards in their application. He points out that the West may object to the reversal of democracy in some countries but not in others, and that there is a perception in the Islamic world that the loss of Islamic lives is not valued as much as it should be. He suggests that imposing democracy without proper preparation, as in the Balkans or parts of Africa, can lead to disastrous results, such as the rise of nationalist sentiment and instability. He emphasises that it took centuries for Western nations to reach their current standards of human rights, such as giving women and minorities the right to vote, and that this progress was not achieved overnight.

== Personal life ==
Mahbubani was previously married to Gretchen Gustafson, a journalist and author on 21 June 1975.

Mahbubani later married Anne King Markey on 30 March 1985. When Mahbubani first met Anne, she was part of the U.S. Commodity Futures Trading Commission and he was serving as the deputy chief of the Singaporean mission in Washington, D.C. The couple has two sons and one daughter.

Mahbubani said in an interview that he enjoys jogging as a way of relaxing and easing his mind. He also has a habit of writing while listening to the music of Mohammed Rafi which his mother often put on the radio when he was a child. He also has a Chinese name, being known as (Chinese: 马凯硕; pinyin: Mǎ Kǎishuò).

In April 2016, Mahbubani suffered severe chest pains while jogging. He later underwent a double heart bypass operation.

== Books ==
- Can Asians Think? Understanding the Divide Between East and West., Steerforth, 2001, ISBN 978-1-58642-033-8; Times Editions; 3rd edition, 2004, ISBN 978-981-232-789-5
- Beyond the Age of Innocence: Rebuilding Trust Between America and the World, Perseus Books Group, 2005, ISBN 978-1-58648-268-8
- The New Asian Hemisphere: The Irresistible Shift of Global Power to the East, PublicAffairs, 2008, ISBN 978-1-58648-466-8
- The Great Convergence: Asia, the West, and the Logic of One World, PublicAffairs, 2013, ISBN 978-1610390330
- Can Singapore Survive?, Straits Times Books, 2015, ISBN 978-9814342971
- The ASEAN Miracle: A Catalyst for Peace, Ridge Books, 2017, ISBN 978-9814722490
- Has the West Lost It? A Provocation, Penguin Books, 2018, ISBN 978-0241312865
- Has China Won?: The Chinese Challenge to American Primacy, PublicAffairs, 2020, ISBN 978-1541768130
- The Asian 21st Century, Springer, 2022, ISBN 978-9811668135
- Living the Asian Century: An Undiplomatic Memoir, PublicAffairs, 2024, ISBN 978-1541703049
- Can Asians Think of Peace? (edited with Varigonda Kesava Chandra, Kristen Tang), Springer, 2025, ISBN 978-9819656653
