= Seeking.com =

Online dating service

- Website type: Online dating service Social network service
- Available in: English, Spanish, Mandarin, French, German, Portuguese, Dutch, Japanese
- Owner: Brandon Wade
- Revenue: US$40,000,000 (2016)
- Website: seeking.com
- Commercial: Yes
- Registration: Yes
- Users: 46,000,000+ (2024)
- Launched: March 2006
- Current status: Active

Seeking.com (formerly known as SeekingArrangement) is an American online dating service founded by Brandon Wade in San Francisco, California, in October 2006.

Wade is CEO of the company alongside his wife, co-CEO Dana Rosewall, whom he met on the site in 2020.

== History ==
Seeking.com was founded as SeekingArrangement.com in 2006 by Brandon Wade, who was born in Singapore and later moved to the U.S. to attend the Massachusetts Institute of Technology.

By 2009, the website reported more than 300,000 registered members and had an active blog in which users debated different subjects related to sugar dating.

When the 2012 Republican National Convention took place in Tampa Bay, Florida, the website saw a 25.9% increase of site users stemming from this geographic area. This increase translates to the average of 1,823 daily users increasing to 2,295 accessing the site at this reported time. According to The Huffington Post, among the 200,000 Sugar Daddy users, 42.1% reportedly identify as Republicans and 34.9% as Democrats.

In October 2013, the website had a surge in registrations during the U.S. federal government shutdown.

In 2016, American entrepreneur and part of the UK series, "Dragon's Den", Doug Richard admitted to consensual sexual activity with a minor he met through SeekingArrangement, believing her to be 17 at the time. The court heard that the minor in question told Richard on a number of occasions that she was 17. On January 29, 2016, Richard was cleared of all charges brought against him by a unanimous jury decision.

By 2016, the website reported having 5 million members and that it generated nearly US$40,000,000 in revenue each year.

In 2021, the company began encouraging users to focus more on finding long-term relationships. By February 2022, the website had completed a rebrand to Seeking.com to reposition the site as a luxury dating service. According to Wade, the decision to shift the focus of the site was inspired by the success of his own relationship with his wife and co-CEO, Dana Rosewall, who he met on the site in 2020.

In June 2022, the website's founder Wade stepped down as CEO and was succeeded by Ruben Buell, who was CEO of Reflex Media, the company that maintains Seeking.com and several other similar websites. During Buell's two-year tenure as CEO, Wade remained a strategic advisor to the company.

In June 2024, Wade returned to Seeking as co-CEO alongside his wife Dana, who brought a female perspective to the company's leadership, including the priority to encourage meaningful relationships.

As of 2024, the site has more than 46 million users.

=== College users ===
In 2010, the website began offering free Premium Memberships to students who registered using their university email addresses. By January 2013, the website reported 2 million users, of which 44 percent were college students after seeing a significant increase in college students registering for the site compared to the previous year.

In 2014, over 1.4 million students were registered on the website. Requests from Sugar Babies varied from assistance with college expenses to monthly allowances for living expenses.

== Operations ==
The company's business model is based on a membership system. Members are able to register for site services free of charge, which provides them with a limited number of messages. Members have the option to purchase credits for expanded messaging privileges on either a monthly or annual basis with Premium and Diamond Memberships. The site promotes security and personal safety including background checks, two-factor authentication and a customer service department.

In 2025 the site made additions to enforce user verification, prevent fraud and address violations.

The website is used in more 130 countries and includes versions of the interface in eight languages. The company headquarters is presently located in Las Vegas, Nevada. There are additional offices located in Ukraine and Singapore.
