= List of reportedly haunted locations =

This is a list of locations that are (or have been) said to be haunted by ghosts, demons, or other supernatural beings throughout the world. Reports of haunted locations are part of ghostlore, which is a form of folklore and witchcraft.

== Afghanistan ==
- Observation Post Rock was a military outpost used by American and British forces during the War in Afghanistan (2001–2021). It was built on top of a man-made hill in Helmand Province that is believed to date back to the 17th century and was used as a spiritual site and tomb by villagers. Residents claim that killings were carried out near the area during the country's numerous conflicts, while soldiers stationed at the site reported sudden temperature drops, static noises over the radio and hearing voices speaking in Russian at night.

== Albania ==
- Vila 31 in Tirana was the former residence of Communist dictator Enver Hoxha. After the fall of communism, it was converted into an arts space. Residing artists experienced empty rooms being locked from the inside, items flying off shelves and unexplained nocturnal noises.

== Argentina ==
- Cinco Saltos in Río Negro has been reported to have a number of ghosts, most of them reportedly the result of witchcraft. In 2009, an intact corpse of an 8- to 12-year-old girl who had died in the 1930s was found in a cemetery ossuary.
- La Recoleta Cemetery in Buenos Aires is a famous Argentinian haunted place. Several ghostly entities are reported, but the most celebrated is a girl, named Rufina Cambaceres, who allegedly was buried alive in 1902.

== Australia ==
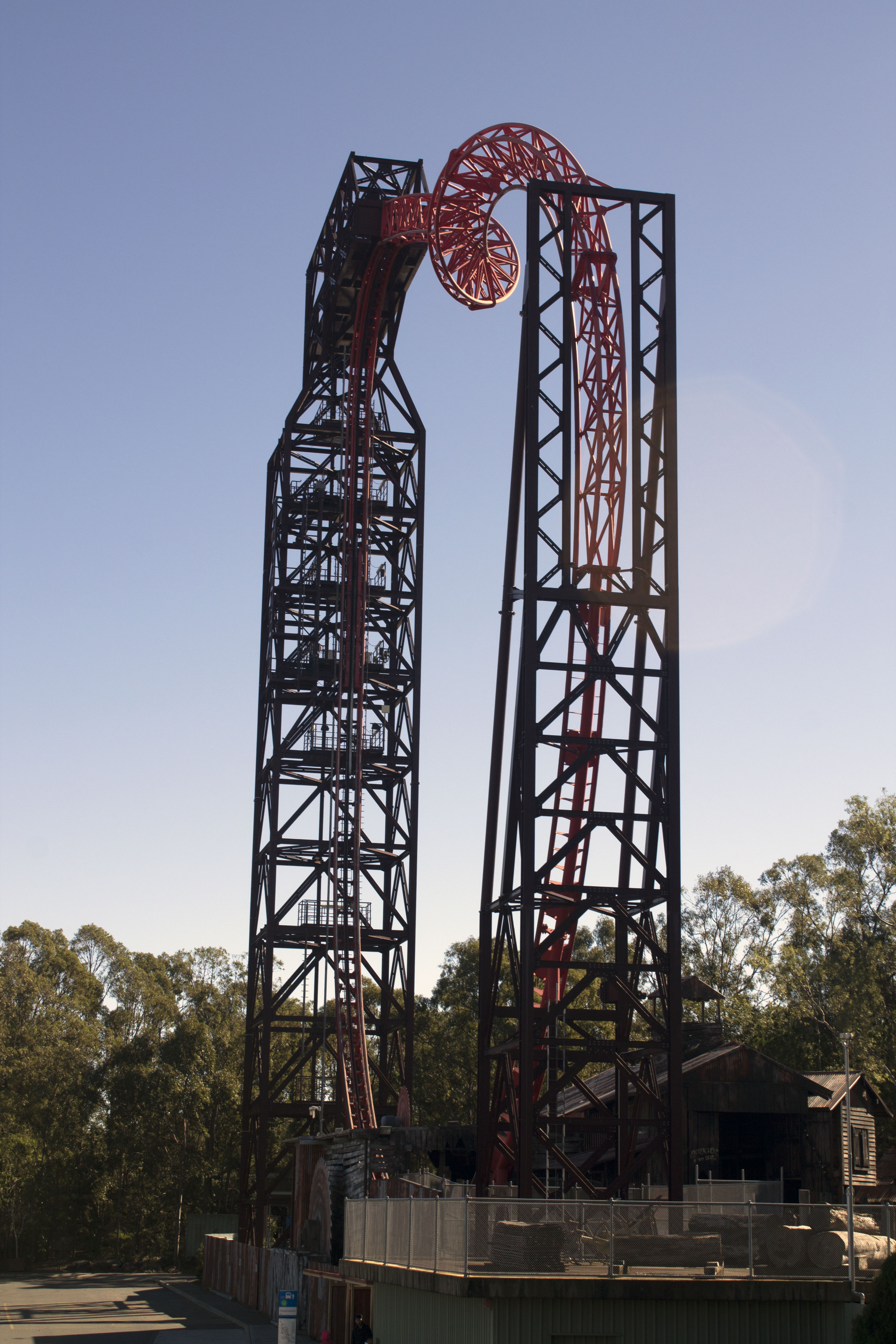
BuzzSaw roller coaster in Dreamworld

- Ararat Lunatic Asylum, or Aradale, is the largest abandoned lunatic asylum in Ararat. Opened in 1867, Aradale was reserved for many of the incurable mental patients in Victoria during the 1800s. An estimated 13,000 people died here during 140 years of operation.
- Beechworth Lunatic Asylum in Beechworth, Victoria is reportedly haunted by several ghosts of departed patients. Open from 1867 to 1995, it has appeared in several books, television shows, and documentaries, including A.C.T. Paranormal. Ghost tours run nightly.
- Dreamworld is a theme park in Coomera, Queensland. One building inside the grounds of the theme park, where the reality television series Big Brother Australia is produced, has been reported to be haunted since the show's first season in 2001. Numerous production staff claim to have witnessed the presence of a young girl, as well as a child's voice and fog appearing late at night and early in the morning.
- The Hotel Kurrajong in Canberra is said to be haunted by the ghost of former Prime Minister Ben Chifley, who died there in 1951. Some reports have Chifley pointing towards Old Parliament House, another location said to be haunted.
- Monte Cristo Homestead in Junee, New South Wales was the site of seven deaths during the 1800s, and is reported to be the most haunted house in Australia. Various ghost groups have reported sightings there.
- North Head Quarantine Station in Manly, New South Wales housed victims of a number of diseases including smallpox and the Spanish flu between 1833 and 1984. It was the site of over 500 deaths. A number of ghost tours are run on the grounds, which includes a large cemetery.
- Port Arthur, Tasmania has a reported 2,000 ghost sightings.
- The Princess Alexandra Hospital in Brisbane, Queensland has been haunted by a ghost bus (subscription required)and also the ghosts of A1 and D Pod.
- The Princess Theatre Melbourne has reported several ghosts since the building opened in 1886. The theatre's best known "inhabitant" is Frederick Baker, whose stage name was Frederick Federici, a talented bass-baritone singer who died during March 1888 whilst singing the role of Mephistopheles in Faust – and who was seen by the rest of the cast taking his bows with them soon thereafter. For years the theater kept a seat vacant in the dress circle for Federici (only ceasing the practice on economic grounds), and his appearance in the dress circle during rehearsals for a new show is considered a good omen.
- Willow Court Asylum is reported to have numerous ghosts.

== Bangladesh ==
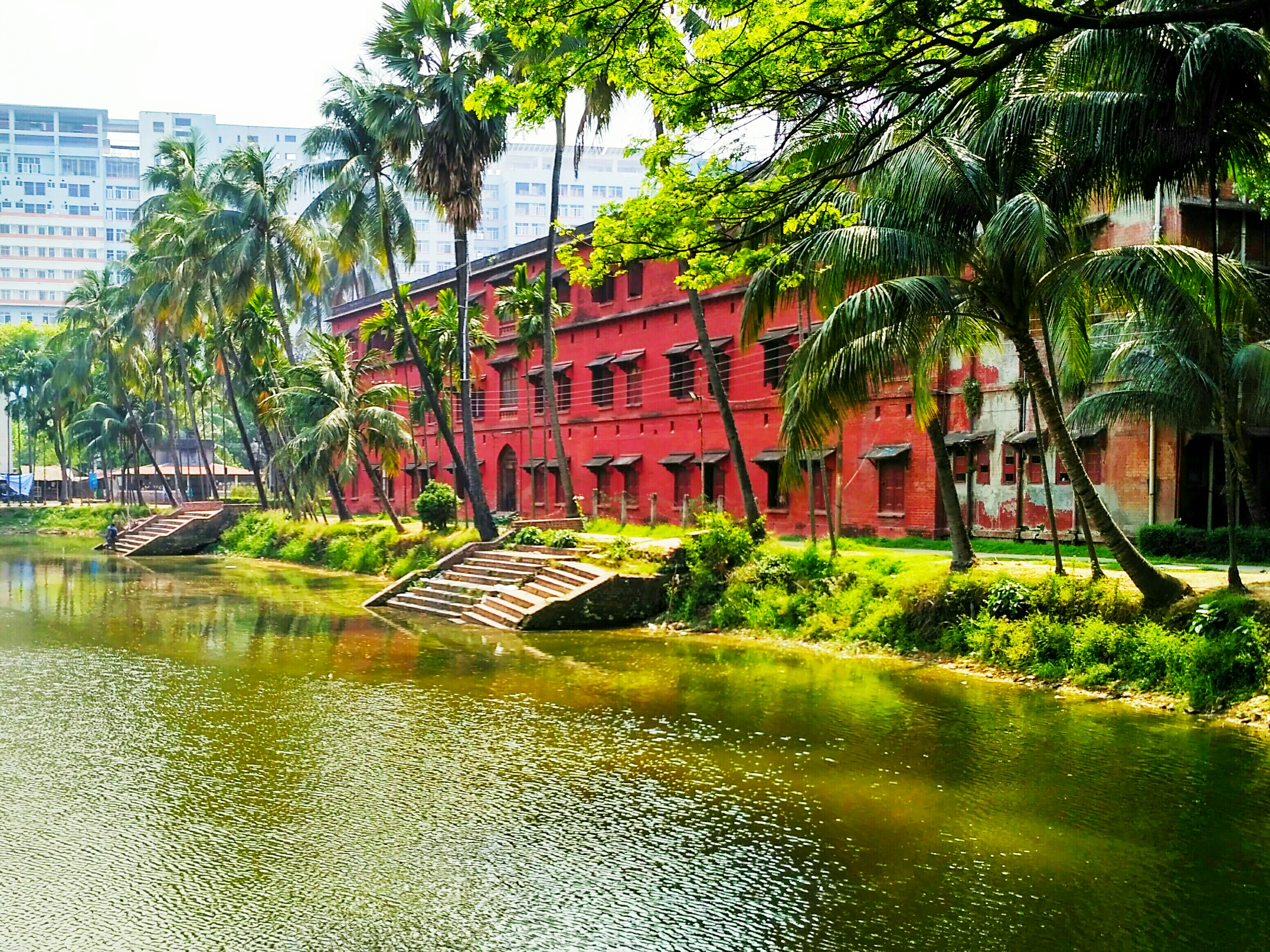
View of Shahidullah Hall, Dhaka University at the west side of the pond

- Dhaka Airport Road: The segment of the road between Nikunjo and Biman office is reported by believers to be haunted by a lady at night, supposedly causing accidents.
- Dhaka Golf Heights, Banani, Dhaka: Claimed by believers to be haunted by a crying baby, and feelings of being watched are reported.
- Under-construction apartment in Old DOHS, Banani, Dhaka: Said to have ties to Satanism. Lanes 4 and 5 are reputed to have been built on top of graves.
- Purbo Nayatola Rail Crossing, Dhaka: Reported by believers to be haunted by a woman frantically looking for her missing infant.
- Shahidullah Hall Pond, Dhaka: The old pond adjoining Shahidullah Hall at Dhaka University campus is believed to be haunted by people who drowned in the pond.
- Farmhouse in Comilla: A huge farmhouse in Comilla is reported to be haunted by black shadows assaulting people at night.

== Barbados ==
- Chase Vault is a burial vault in the cemetery of the Christ Church Parish Church in Oistins, Christ Church Parish, best known for a widespread but unverified legend of "mysterious moving coffins". According to the story, each time the heavily sealed vault was opened during the early 19th century for burial of a family member, all of the lead coffins had changed position. The facts of the story are unverified, and skeptics call the tale "historically dubious." The tale appears to have originated from anecdotes told by Thomas H. Orderson, Rector of Christ Church during the 1800s, and subsequently repeated in James Edward Alexander's 1833 Transatlantic Sketches.

== Belize ==
- Xunantunich: A Maya archaeological site said to be haunted by the ghost of a black-haired lady with red, glowing eyes whose first recorded appearance was to a research team in 1893.

== Brazil ==
- The Bibi Costa Mansion in Belém, the city residence of José Júlio de Andrade (1862 – 1953). De Andrade was noted for his cruelty towards his workers and ownership of slaves long after the abolition of slavery in Brazil; with "dozens of testimonies of the noise of chains dragging across the floor, sudden screams, figures, and voices" in the mansion across its history.
- The Joelma Building (now the Praça da Bandeira Building) in São Paulo is allegedly haunted by victims of the fire that started on 1 February 1974, after an air conditioning unit on the twelfth floor overheated; centered on the "Mystery of the Thirteen Souls", individuals who died within an elevator as they were trying to escape the fire, and are haunting the building.

== Cambodia ==
- Kampong Chhnang: The famous "ghost house" in Cambodia.
- S-21 Prison: This infamous detention center is haunted by the victims of the Cambodian genocide.

== Czech Republic ==
- Zvíkov Castle: Until 1597 there are stories about a Zvíkovský Rarášek (Rarach is a supernatural being common in Slavic folklore, similar to an imp or trickster) which haunts people in the ancient tower, Markomanka. This tower has stones engraved with unknown symbols, and was built during the Marcomanni rule over Bohemia, in the 1st century BC and 2nd century AD. It was integrated into Zvíkov castle hundreds of years later. Strange events occur here frequently, including weird photos, technical problems, unpredictable behaviour of animals, spontaneous extinguishing of fires, electromagnetic anomalies, and the presence of ghosts. In Czech media it's a popular subject of investigation. Other areas of the castle are also haunted; it is said to be dangerous to sleep in the main tower, as anyone who does supposedly dies within a year. Another monster common in Czech culture, fire hounds are also part of the myths surrounding the castle. It is said that these spectral dogs (in some accounts they are depicted with burning eyes) are guarding a hidden tunnel underneath Zvíkov.

== Cuba ==
- In 1860 six soldiers disappeared on duty at a watch tower at San Juan at 20°9'6"N 76°53'20"W without a trace after firing some shots. Officer Manolo Herez from Manzanillo was called for the investigation of these incidents. He guarded together with some sergeants from a nearby forest the tower with a soldier on duty. In the first six nights nothing unusual occurred. On the following night it was spotted, then, when the guard left the tower for a short break, a mysterious dark spot appeared and followed him into the tower. Suddenly a bright light appeared in the tower, which allowed Manolo Herez and his men to see the guard in the tower. Then a bang occurred and the light went off. The guard of the tower could not be found anymore. There was only one entrance to the tower, and the window in the tower was not wide enough that a man could pass through it.

== Egypt ==
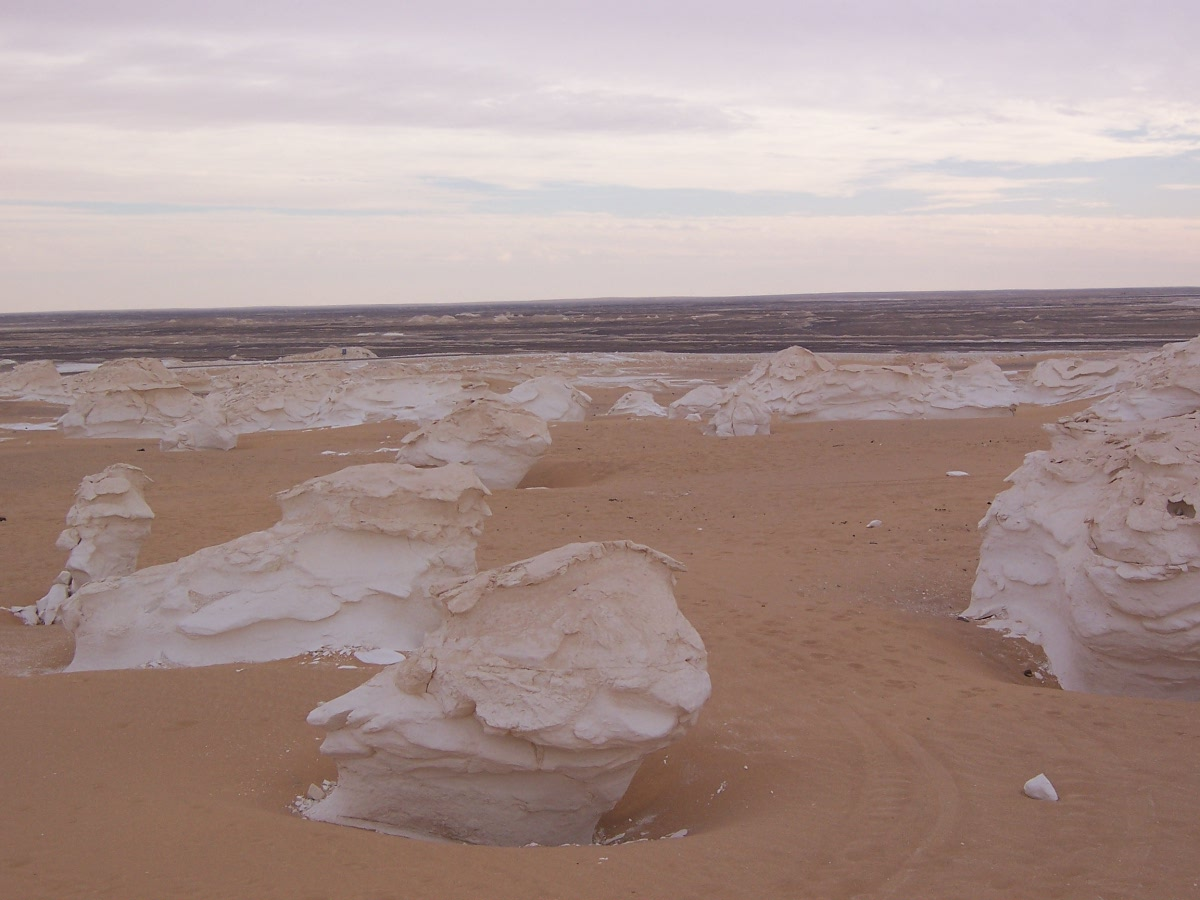
Farafra Desert

- Baron Empain Palace: Tourists have reportedly heard voices throughout the palace late at night. Guards and police have reported seeing ghostly apparitions of people who were once residents of the palace, wandering the outside lawn at midnight.
- Farafra Desert: The ghost of Akhenaten is said to wander the Farafra Desert (also known as the White Desert) of Egypt, reported by dozens of tourists and nomads. Legend says this is because Akhenaten abolished the Egyptian gods when he became Pharaoh, angering the religious followers and priests of Egypt. Upon his death, the priests are believed to have cursed him to wander the deserts forever as punishment.
- Pyramids of Giza: A man in early 20th-century clothing has been seen by visitors, rumored to be the ghost of Howard Carter. Various employees and tourists have reported seeing an orb apparition of an Egyptian Pharaoh, floating away from the pyramids towards the Valley of the Kings.
- Valley of the Kings: Eyewitnesses have reported seeing the vision of an Egyptian Pharaoh in the Valley of the Kings, wearing his golden collar, headdress, and riding a fiery chariot with black phantom horses.

== Estonia ==
- Kolga mõis: A manor in Lahemaa National Park that is said to be haunted by multiple ghosts, including that of the murdered son of the manor's lord, a gray woman who committed infanticide, card-players and a red-haired witch whose bite leads to the death of male victims within the year.
- Mooste mõis: A manor turned hotel in Põlva County said to be haunted by a manor lord's son who died on a hunting trip.
- Palmse mõis: A manor turned hotel in Lääne-Viru County that has incidents of mysterious music, sounds of crying children, doors moving on their own, and a ghost arranging the contents of the library.
- Porkuni mõis: A manor near Väike-Maarja that is said to be haunted by fawn-like creatures and a light that appears on the pond at midnight.

== Finland ==
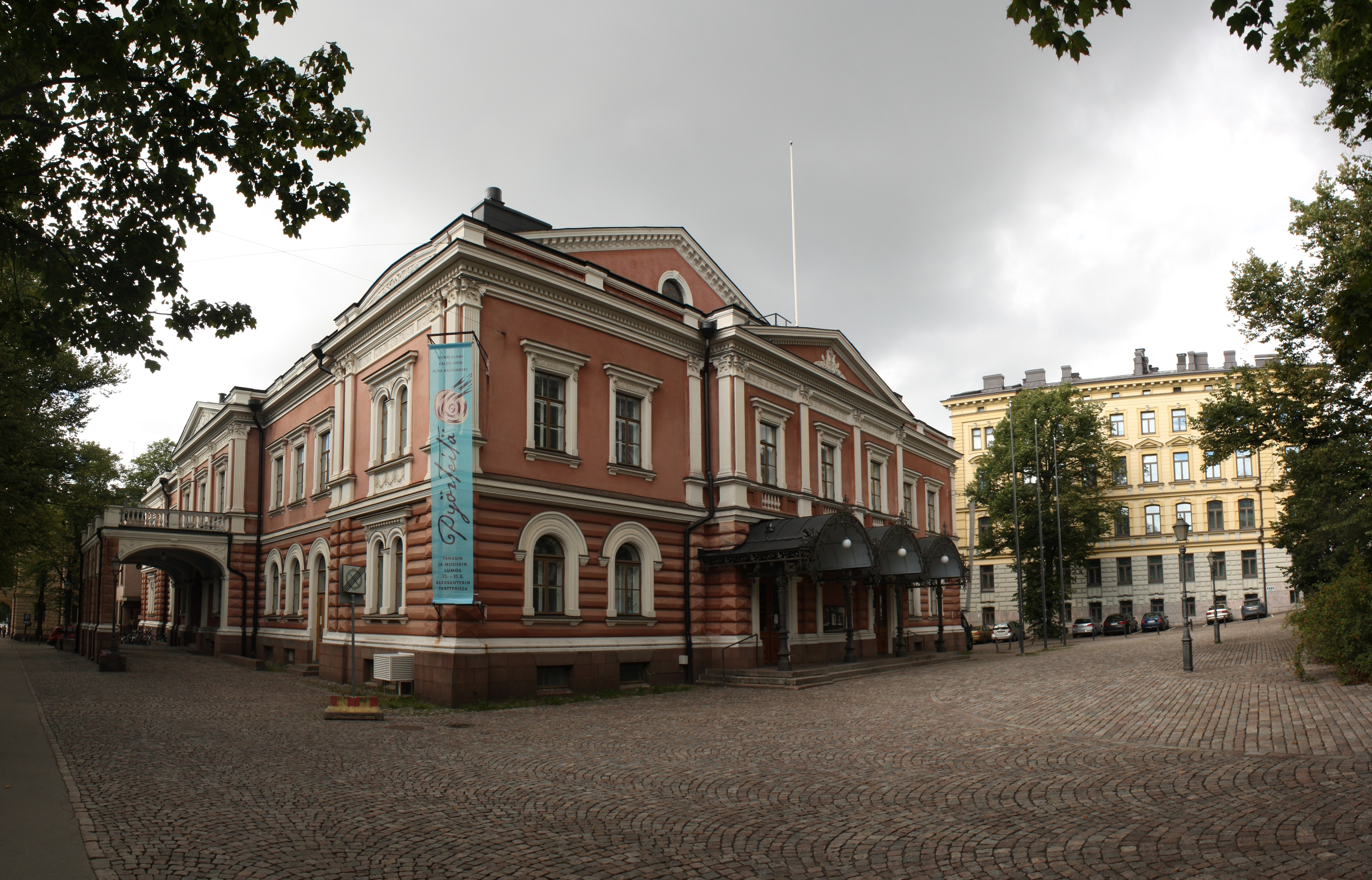
Alexander Theatre

- Alexander Theatre in Helsinki is reportedly haunted by the ghost of an officer. The ghost moved to Helsinki as the tiles to build Alexander Theatre were relocated from Åland. Some have suggested that the officer died in the Crimean War and has been there ever since.
- The Finnish National Theatre in Helsinki is reportedly haunted by at least three ghosts - an unknown Grey Lady and the ghosts of actors Aarne Leppänen and Urho Somersalmi.
- Haihara Manor in Tampere is supposedly haunted by The Blue Maid, former maid of the manor.
- Nummela Sanatorium, an abandoned hospital in the village of Röykkä has been rumoured to exhibit paranormal phenomena, like mysterious lights appearing in the windows of the building, and on the edge of the roof, the ghost of a woman who commits suicide by jumping down. There is also a rumour that the hospital might be haunted by the spirit of a girl who died there at a young age.
- Omenainen, an uninhabited island in the municipality of Nagu (now Pargas) in the central Archipelago Sea, which was formerly a burial ground for those parishioners of Rymättylä and Nagu whom the church refused to bury in consecrated ground (because they'd committed, for example, murder, and other sins). In folklore, the island is considered cursed and ghost stories are told about it.
- Svenska Klubben (The Swedish Club) house in Kruununhaka, Helsinki, is haunted by the Grey Madame. She is rumoured to be the former lady of the house who had an affair with her chauffeur. She is known to swing the chandeliers, play the piano and to walk around the house.
- Villa Kleineh, a historical villa in Helsinki currently used by the Dutch embassy, reportedly hosts a ghost called The White Lady.

== Georgia ==
- Devil's House, Tbilisi: A 19th-century residence that is named after the Devil-like figure carved on its wall. According to legend, it was built by an Armenian merchant who engaged in occult practices. A female relative of the merchant also committed suicide in the garden. Paranormal activity such as flying items and strange noises is said to occur at the house.

== Germany ==
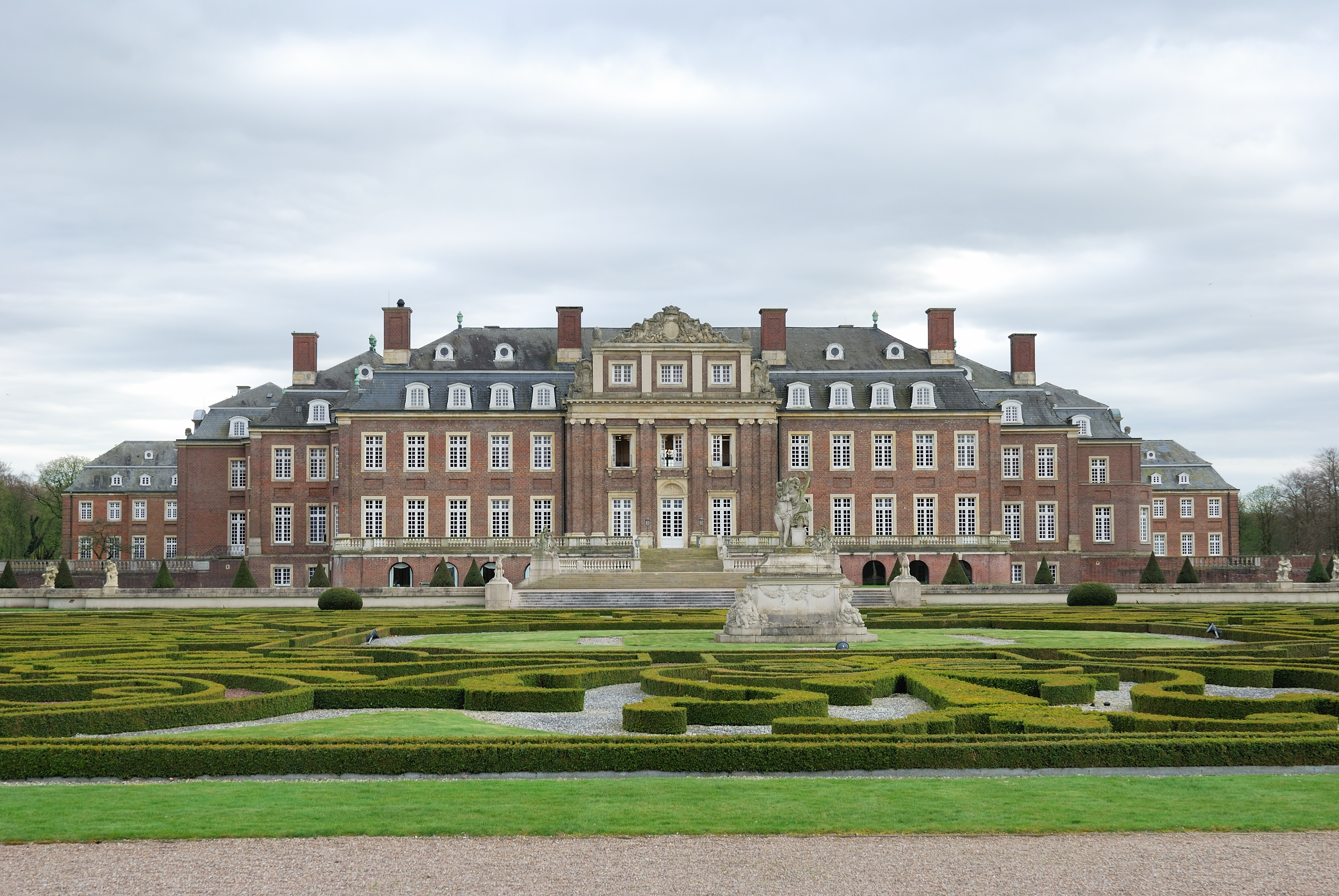
Northern front of Schloss Nordkirchen

- Heidelberg: The Hexenturm (Witches Tower) and the Nazi Amphitheatre are both said to be haunted by various ghosts.
- Frankenstein Castle: Frankenstein Castle (German: Burg Frankenstein) is a real hilltop castle in the Odenwald, overlooking the city of Darmstadt, and allegedly an inspiration for Mary Shelley when she wrote her monster novel Frankenstein. The SyFy TV show Ghost Hunters International aired an entire episode about the castle and testified it had "... significant paranormal activity".

== Ghana ==
- Lake Volta: Said to be haunted by the ghosts of residents displaced when the reservoir filled up and are blamed for taking several individuals, as well as a ghost ship carrying the spirits of sailors who died on the lake that appears on moonless nights.

== Greece ==
- Kontos Mansion, Ano Lechonia: The former residence of the Russian ambassador, Nikolas Kontos, built in 1900. The house is said to be haunted by the ghosts of Kontos' children, who died suspiciously after allegedly being poisoned by milk that was contaminated by a lizard, and rebels from the time that the site was used as a torture hub by the Nazis during the Axis occupation of Greece.
- Parnitha Sanatorium: A sanatorium for tuberculosis patients operated at the mountain from 1917 until the 1960s. Since then, the abandoned building is said to be haunted with changes in temperature and phantom noises such as that of a girl crying for water.
- Villa Kazouli, Kifisia: The summer residence of the Alexandrian businessman Nikolas Kazoulis, said to be haunted by the ghosts of Nazi victims when it became a headquarters for the occupiers in World War II.

== Hungary ==
- Boszorkánysziget, Szeged: A small island on the Tisza River said to be haunted by the ghosts of 12 herbalists and healers who were burned at the stake for witchcraft in 1728.
- Széchenyi Mansion, Nagycenk: The Széchenyi family's mausoleum is said to be haunted by the ghost of Archbishop Pál Széchényi, who was allegedly poisoned in the early 18th century and whose mummified body is displayed in a glass coffin.

== Iceland ==
- Gunnuhver: A geothermal mud pool in the Reykjanes Peninsula said to be haunted by the ghost of Gunna, whose spirit was purportedly cast into the site by a priest after she killed her former landlord and his wife in revenge for her death from starvation in the 17th century.
- Reykjavík Centrum Hotel: The ghost of a Viking is said to have emerged during the hotel's construction in 2001. There are also said to be ghosts of children crawling at the venue.

== Indonesia ==
- Lawang Sewu: Dutch-built building in Semarang which served as Administrative Headquarters for the Dutch Indies Railway Company. During World War II, when the Japanese troops took it over. Stories about torture and execution are the source of the haunted lore around it. The name Lawang Sewu translates to "Building of a Thousand Doors."
- Jakarta History Museum: This building is located on the Old Town of Jakarta. It was built in 1710 and served as the city hall for Batavia, the capital of the Dutch East Indies. It opened as a museum in 1974. Folklore of its haunting are connected to violence committed under the colonial government.
- Jeruk Purut Cemetery: According to local legend, the cemetery is haunted by a decapitated pastor.
- Menara Saidah: A 28-storey building located in East Jakarta was once an office tower owned by a local Arab-Indonesian businessman of the same name. The building was abandoned in 2007. Since then, there are numerous stories about paranormal activities within the building such as a lady in red, ghost sightings in the basement, and mysterious ride hailing orders, postal deliveries and job interview invitations coming from the tower. The building remains a popular spot among local ghost hunters.
- Toko Merah: A Dutch colonial building located in Jakarta Old Town was built by Governor-General Gustaaf Willem van Imhoff and later owned by Chinese-Indonesian landlord Oey Liauw Kong. The building was known to be the site of the 1740 Batavia massacre when the building was used for torture and killings at the time. Many locals report the sound of screaming at night and sightings of a Dutch lady in a white gown.
- Hotel Tugu Malang: A 5-star hotel located in the heart of Malang, Hotel Tugu is known for its collection of Peranakan antiquities from the Dutch colonial era. There are some myth surrounding the portrait of Oei Hui-lan, the former First Lady of China who was still related to the hotel owner that was rumoured to have some mystical aura. Some visitors reported that they were allegedly visited by the spirit of Oei Hui-lan on their sleep.
- City Plaza Klender: Located in Klender, a subdistrict of Duren Sawit in East Jakarta, originally called Central Klender Plaza, the mall changed its name and ownerships several times from Citra Mal Klender and finally City Plaza Klender. During the May 1998 riots of Indonesia, the mall was burned and looted by rioters, killing 288-488 people inside. Since then, there are many urban legends surfacing among locals regarding the mall, many claimed seeing the ghost of security guards, clerk, and some visitors with third-degree burns. There are also claims that the smell of blood and screams can still be heard at night.
- Benteng Pendem: Located in Cilacap, Central Java, the fort was built in 1861 and finished in 1879, to protect the city's port. After Indonesian independence, the fort was briefly owned by the Indonesian Army until it was abandoned in 1965. In 1986, it became a tourist attraction. The fort is said to be haunted and is a popular spot among ghost hunters.
- Plaza Surabaya: One of the earliest shopping malls in Surabaya was once a wartime hospital building called Centrale Burgerlijke Ziekenhaus that treats wounded soldiers during World War II and the Indonesian Revolution. Due to its nature, the mall has become subject of numerous urban legends about paranormal activities such as the ghost of nurse who died in an elevator incident, a phantom elevator, and the ghost of a lady in red gown in the basement area. Mall management is said to have called exorcists to exorcise the mall from further paranormal activities.
- Pondok Indah: An upscale residential area located in South Jakarta was reportedly to have few haunted abandoned houses. In 2002, there was a report about a missing fried rice peddler near one of the abandoned house in the area. Criminologists however, denied such rumours and called it baseless and unscientific.

== Iraq ==
- Wadi-us-Salaam, Najaf: The world's largest cemetery, containing five million graves of Shiite Muslims. Gravediggers report being assaulted by phantom beings. It is also said that ghuls inhabit burial plots that had been illegally resold.

== Ireland ==
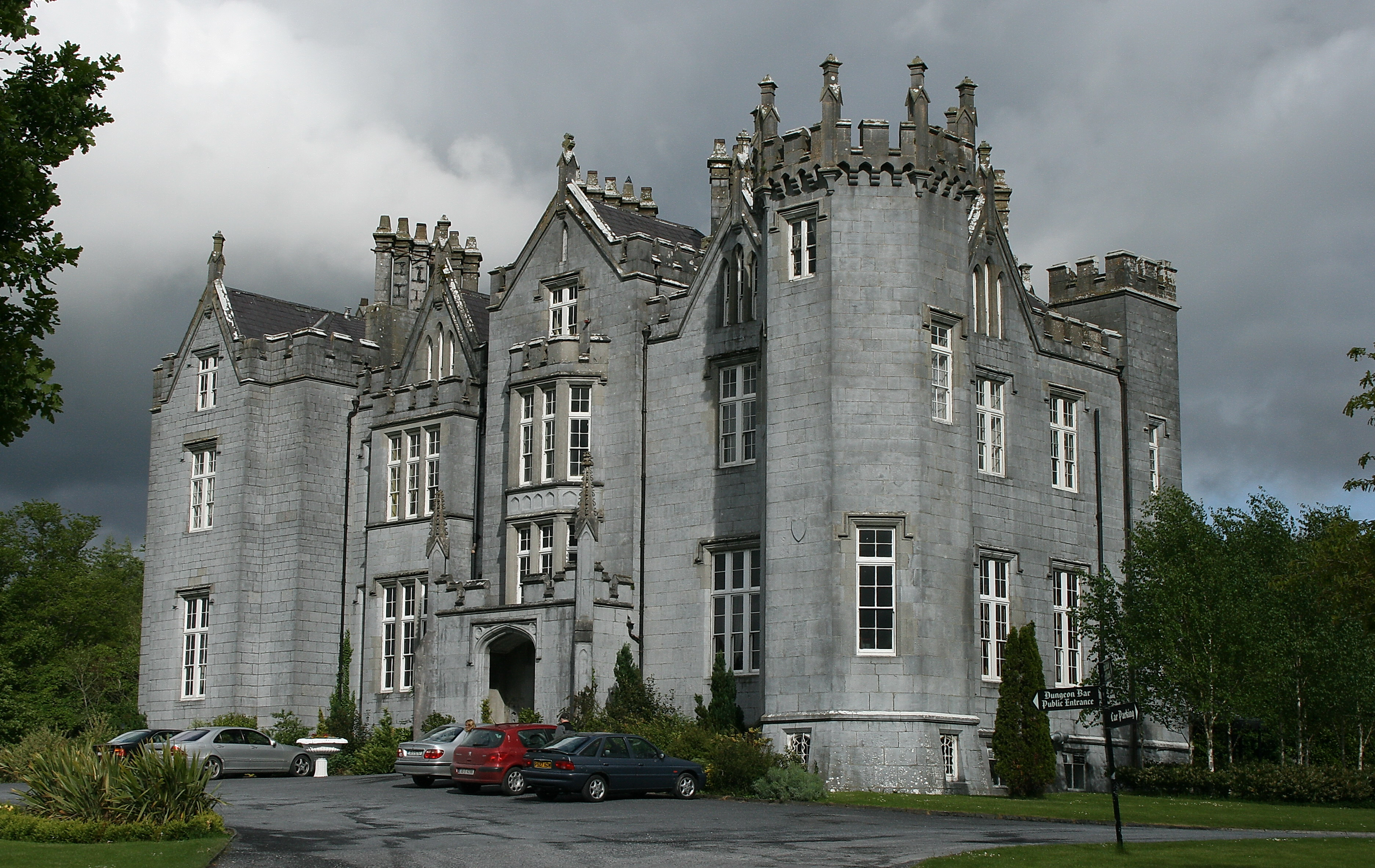
Kinnitty Castle

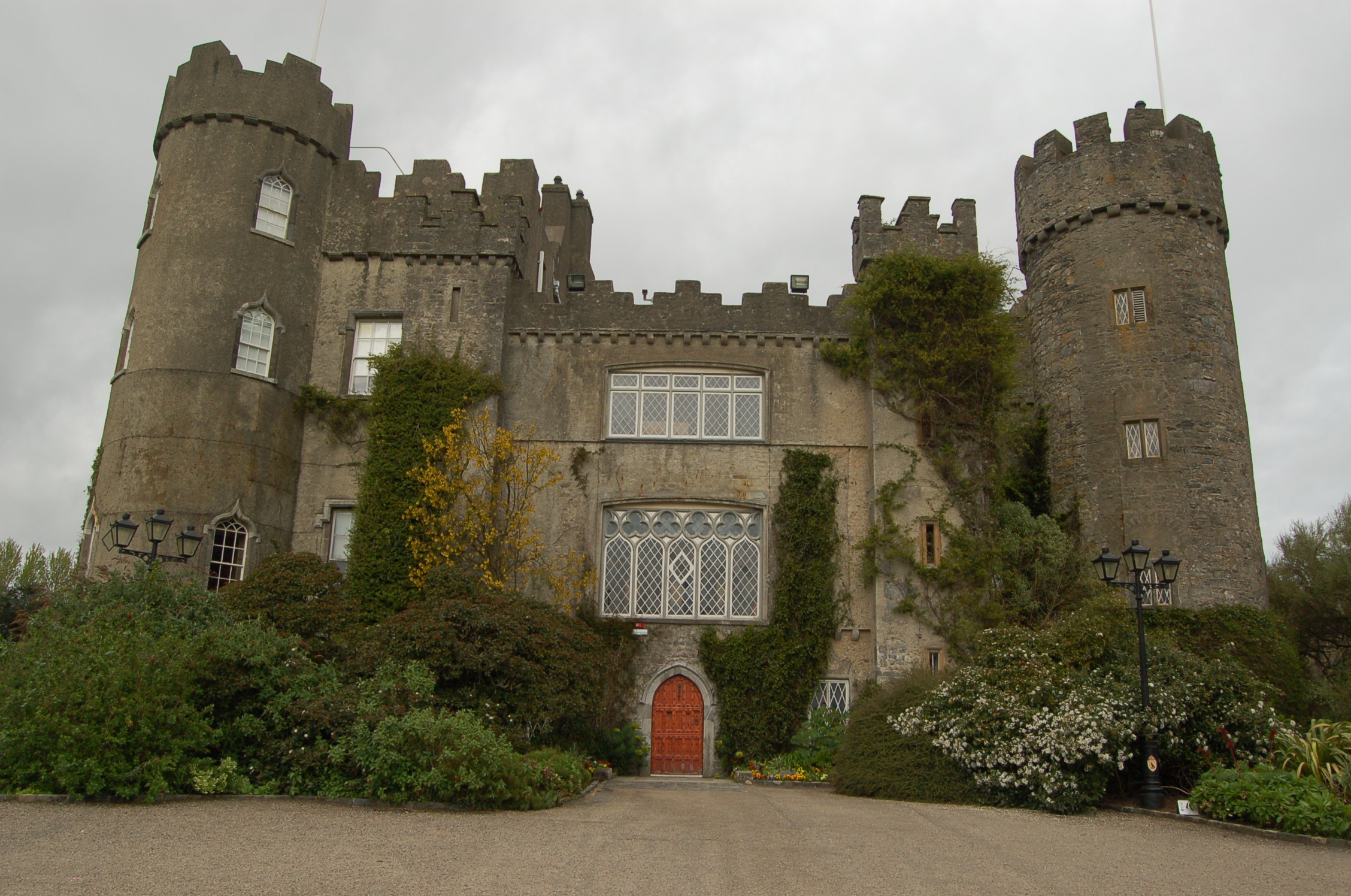
Malahide Castle

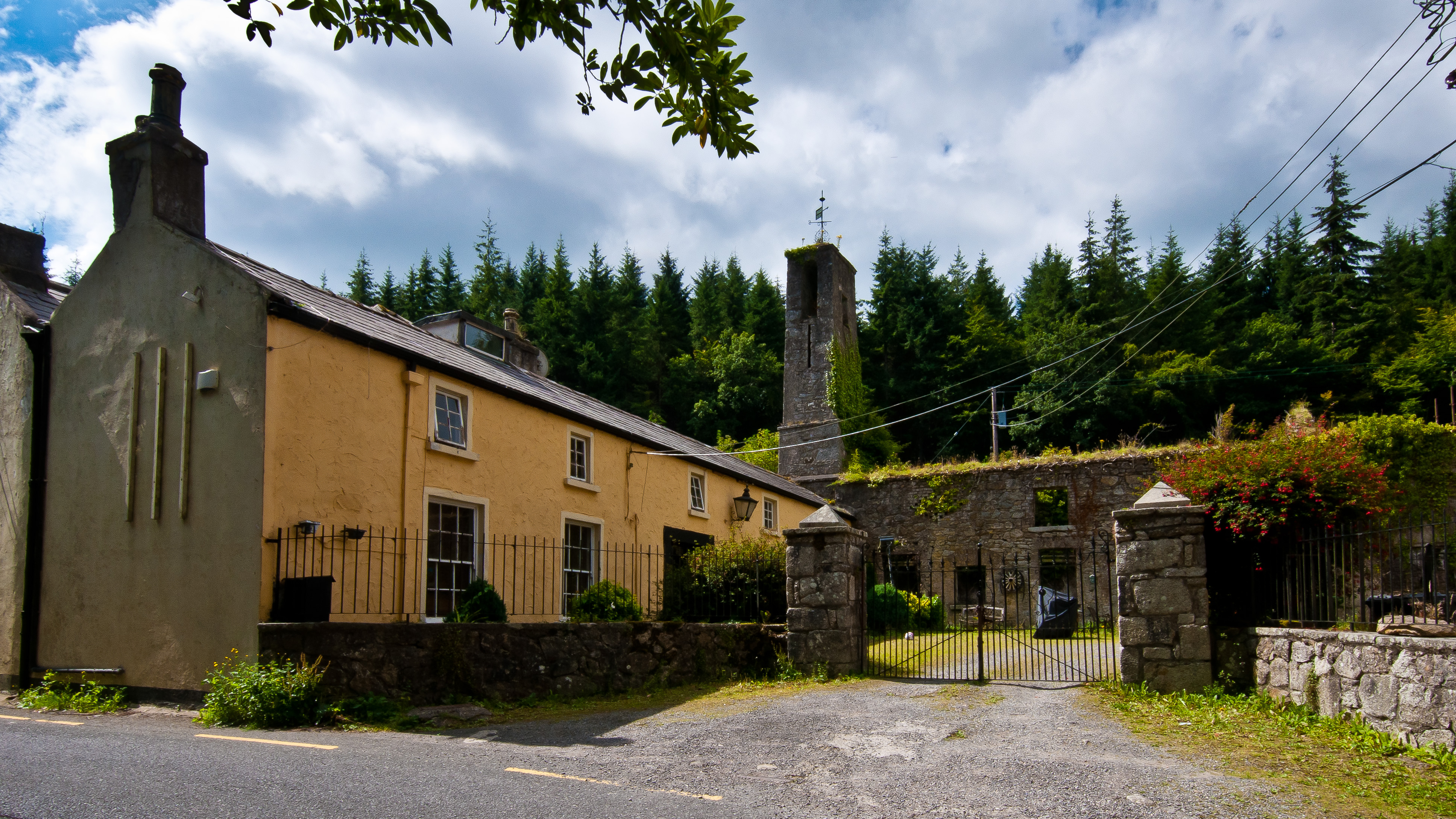
Stewards House, Montpelier Hill

- Charles Fort: Haunted by a 17th-century bride known as "The White Lady of Kinsale".
- Charleville Castle: This castle is haunted by the third Earl of Charleville's younger daughter, Harriet. She lost her life after falling from the main staircase of this building at the age of eight, in April 1861.
- Ducketts Grove: The mansion was owned by the Duckett family for 300 years, and is said to be haunted by a Banshee Ghost. On 17 March 2011, the SyFy show Destination Truth featured a four-hour live investigation for the season finale to find out the mystery of the ruins.
- Kilmainham Gaol: This former prison has paranormal activities of lights which often turn themselves on and off in the prison's chapel, unseen forces pushing people over, apparitional footsteps, the feeling of being watched by spirits, as well as unexplained bangs and disembodied voices.
- Kinnitty Castle: This Gothic castle sits on a plot that once housed Druids and Bards. It has witnessed a long and turbulent history, and is reportedly the home of many ghosts, the most popular of which is the Phantom Monk of Kinnitty.
- Malahide Castle: This castle is haunted by Lord Galtrim, Sir Walter Hussey, the son of the Baron of Galtrim. Killed in battle on his wedding day during the 15th century, his apparition roams the castle at night, groaning in pain, while pointing at the spear wound in his side. There is also Lady Matilda "Maud" Plunkett. Her spirit appears to workers and guests as she did on the day of her marriage to the Lord Chief Justice. Maud would chase his spirit through the corridors. The third spirit is Puck, a jester who fell in love with Gerard FitzGerald's daughter, Lady Eleanor, who was detained at the castle by Henry VIII for inciting rebellions. One snowy night in December, Puck was found stabbed through the heart, still wearing his jester suit and cap. Before his death, he swore that he would haunt here until a master with a bride from the people ruled this castle. However, he promised not to harm any male Talbot who slept here. Numerous visitors have reported seeing the jester's face on some photos taken here. The White Lady is the fourth apparition here. The White Lady is a painting of a very beautiful, but unknown, lady which hangs on the castle's Great Wall. It is said that she would leave her painting at times and wander through the grounds at night. The fifth and final spirit is Miles Corbet. He was given this castle and the surrounding property by Oliver Cromwell. During the Restoration, Miles was made to pay for his crimes, and was hanged. It is reported that his apparition appears as a whole soldier in armour which then suddenly fall into pieces.
- Montpelier Hill: The Stewards House, or Killakee House, was built around 1765 by the Conolly family as a hunting lodge. The house has a reputation for being haunted. Stories tell of a particularly large ghostly black cat. The best documented account occurred between 1968 and 1970 when the Evening Herald and Evening Press newspapers carried a number of reports regarding a Mrs. Margaret O'Brien and her husband Nicholas, a retired Garda superintendent, who were converting the house into an arts centre. During the conversion, tradesmen employed on the work site began complaining of ghosts. One night, a friend of the O'Briens, artist Tom McAssey, and two workmen were confronted by a spectral figure and a black cat with glowing red eyes. McAssey painted a portrait of the cat which hung in the house for several years afterwards. Although locals were skeptical of the reports, further apparitions were reported, most notably that of an Indian gentleman, and of two nuns called Blessed Margaret and Holy Mary who had taken part in black masses on Montpelier Hill. There were also reports of incorporeal ringing bells and poltergeist activity. In 1970, an RTÉ television crew recorded a documentary about the house. In the documentary, a clairvoyant called Sheila St. Clair communicated with the spirits of the house through automatic writing. In 1971, a plumber working in the house discovered a grave with a skeleton of a small figure, most likely that of a child or, perhaps, the body of the dwarf alleged to have been sacrificed by the members of the Hell Fire Club. The house operated as a restaurant in the 1990s before closing in 2001; it is now a private residence.
- Leap Castle: Many people were imprisoned and executed in this castle, and it is supposedly haunted by several spirits.
- Ross Castle: Guests often wake at night hearing disembodied voices and doors banging and shutting on their own. An apparitional spirit who roams here is Richard Nugent's daughter, Sabina. Her lover, Orwin, drowned himself. A second apparitional spirit who roams here is Orwin's father, Myles "The Slasher" O'Reilly. This Irish soldier spent his last night here before dying in a battle in 1644.
- St. Michan's Church: This church is haunted by disembodied whispering voices from mummies entombed in the vaults.
- Shelbourne Hotel: This hotel is believed to be haunted by a seven-year-old girl from the 18th century, named Mary Masters, who had lived in the row of houses which once stood where the hotel is now. She died due to cholera during 1791. Her apparition roams the halls.

== Israel ==
- International Convention Center, Jerusalem: Believed to be haunted by a worker who died in a fall during construction.
- Russian Hospital, Jerusalem: Believed to be haunted by ghosts dating from the time when a funeral home used to operate at the site.

== Italy ==
- Colosseum: Known also as the Flavian Amphitheatre, was reported to be haunted according to some witnesses and researchers' testimonies. Visitors have described observing ghostly figures wandering the staircases. There have been reports of hearing the cheers and screams from a crowd, while no sign of people existed in the particular section. The vaults were, reportedly, haunted by the spirits of gladiators waiting to fight, actors waiting to perform, and prisoners becoming prepared for execution. Several accounts of cold touches or pushes have been felt by both tourists and employees. Sounds of animals have also been heard within the vaults.
- Poveglia: This island, near Venice, was once a sanctuary to refugees during the Ottoman conflicts, and a hospice for sick patients throughout the centuries. It was detailed, from witnesses, haunted by many victims of the plague. In 1922, the island became home to a mental hospital, where a doctor, reportedly, experimented on patients with crude lobotomies. He later threw himself from the hospital tower after claiming he had been driven mad by the spirits of the island. The island has been featured on the paranormal shows Ghost Adventures and Scariest Places on Earth. Poveglia is widely believed to be one of the most haunted places in the world.
- Hotel Burchianti: It was a popular destination for celebrities during the 20th century. Guests have reported sounds of children skipping down the halls. In the Fresco room, guests claimed they felt icy breaths down their spines.

== Jamaica ==
- Rose Hall, Montego Bay: A plantation estate said to be haunted by the horse-riding ghost of Annie Palmer, also known as the "White Witch", a 19th-century plantation owner who killed three of her husbands and tormented her slaves before being killed in retribution.

== Jordan ==
- Petra: The residence of jinns, supernatural beings in Islam according to the Bedouin.

== Kazakhstan ==
- Barsa-Kelmes: A former island in the Aral Sea whose name translates to "You Will Go But Never Return" in Kazakh. During the Soviet era, it began to earn a haunted reputation amid stories of herders who died while trying the cross the frozen Aral Sea.
- BN-350 reactor, Aktau: A Soviet-era nuclear reactor that closed in 1999 and is undergoing decommissioning, with reports of strange lights and other paranormal phenomena.
- Karagiye: A natural depression with reports of phantom sounds, lights, and other unexplained phenomena.

== Kenya ==
- Menengai: An dormant volcanic crater that was a battlefield between warring Maasai tribes. There are reports of paranormal occurrences involving missing people who reappear without being able to explain the circumstances of their disappearance, and appearances of the devil riding a motorcycle and a flying umbrella that is seen during rains.
- Ruins of Gedi: The site of an ancient city-state that is regarded by the Giriama people to host malevolent spirits.

== Latvia ==
- Bauska Castle: A castle with tales of self-opening doors and echoes of indecipherable languages.
- Dundaga Castle: A manor with tales of self-flickering lights flickering on their own, doors swinging open despite being locked, and piano music originating from empty rooms.
- Mežotne Palace: A neoclassical manor said to be inhabited by a White Lady.
- Sigulda Castle: A castle said to be inhabited by a White Lady which appears on foggy evenings.
- Vanishing Road, Kurzeme: A stretch of forest road passing though forests that is believed to be haunted by a carriage with no visible rider. Motorists on the road are also said to have lost time or become disoriented.

== Liberia ==
- Executive Mansion, Monrovia: The official residence of the President of Liberia is said to be haunted by paranormal activity such as the phantom sounds of applause, the smell of cooking at midnight and ghosts roaming the hallways.

== Lithuania ==
- Barbakanas, Vilnius: A fortress near Gediminas Hill said to be haunted by a woman who was cursed by a beggar after she refused to give him food.
- Hill of Crosses, Šiauliai: Said to be haunted by a procession of ghostly monks who died in a storm that destroyed a church that stood on the site. There are also accounts of hauntings by Samogitian warriors who died defending a castle that also stood on the site from the Livonian Brothers of the Sword in 1348.

== Luxembourg ==
- Falkenstein Castle, Vianden: Said to be haunted by the ghost of a woman who drowned herself after seeing her lover die in front of her during their elopement.
- Fort Rheinsheim: Said to be haunted by the ghost of a women who was locked inside a mine passage and accidentally left for dead by her lover, an Austrian soldier, to avoid being discovered by guards.
- Lenningen: Two veiled figures are said to follow nocturnal hikers in the area's forests.
- Pont du Stierchen: A bridge in the Old City of Luxembourg said to be haunted by the Stierches-geescht, a shape-shifting ghost that is said to physically assault drunkards.

== Malaysia ==
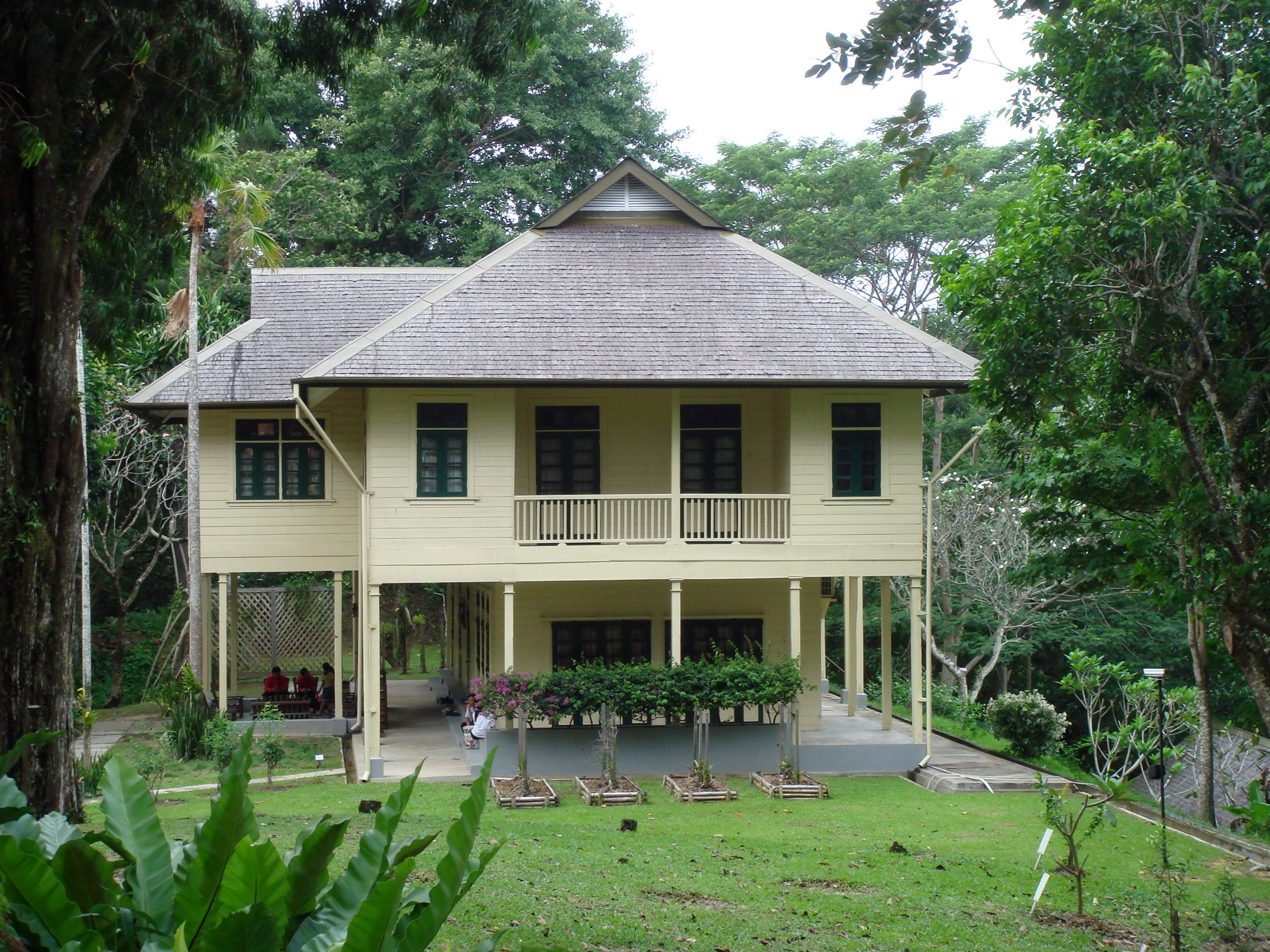
Agnes Keith House in Sandakan, Sabah, Malaysia, 2007

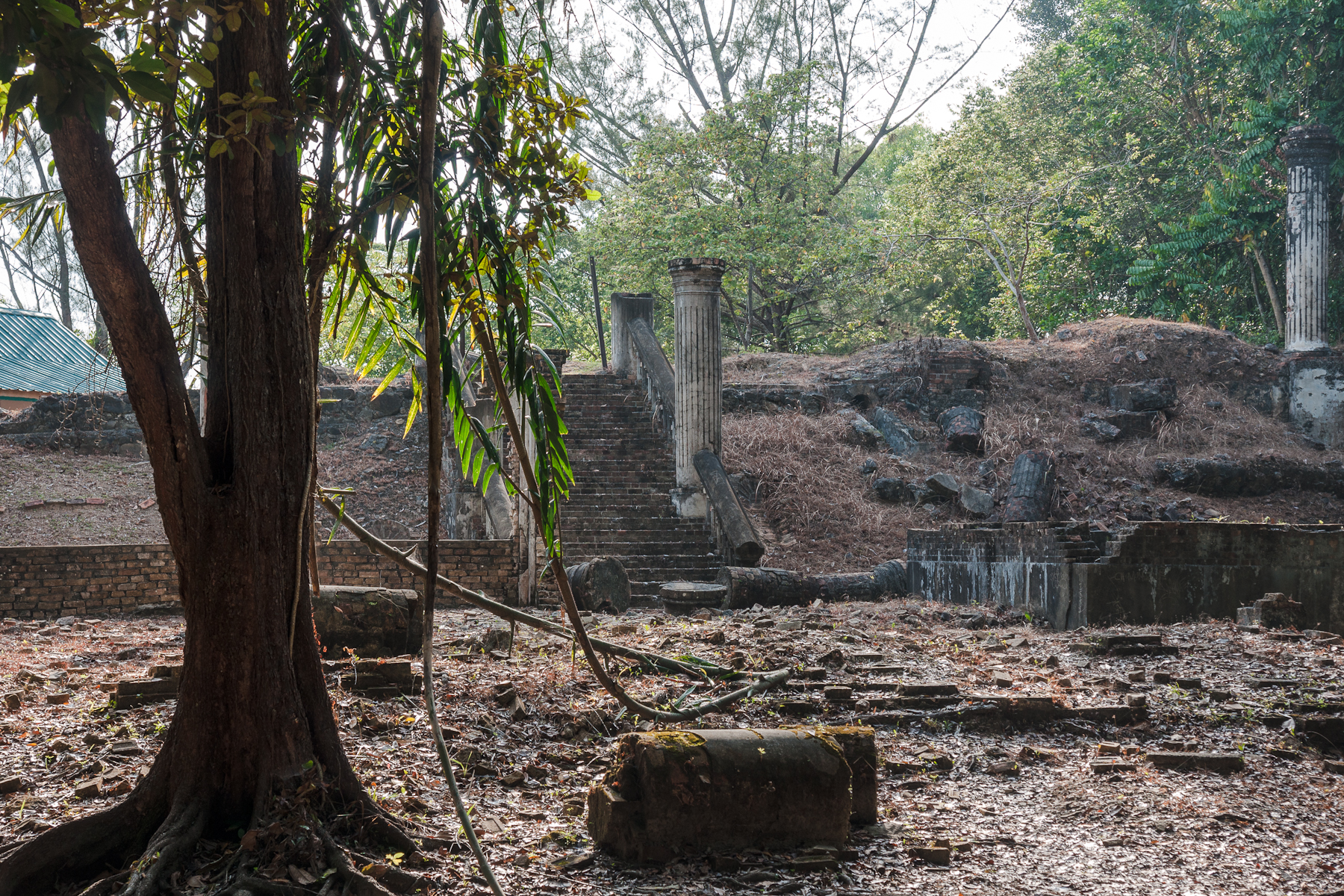
Kinarut Mansion ruins, 2012

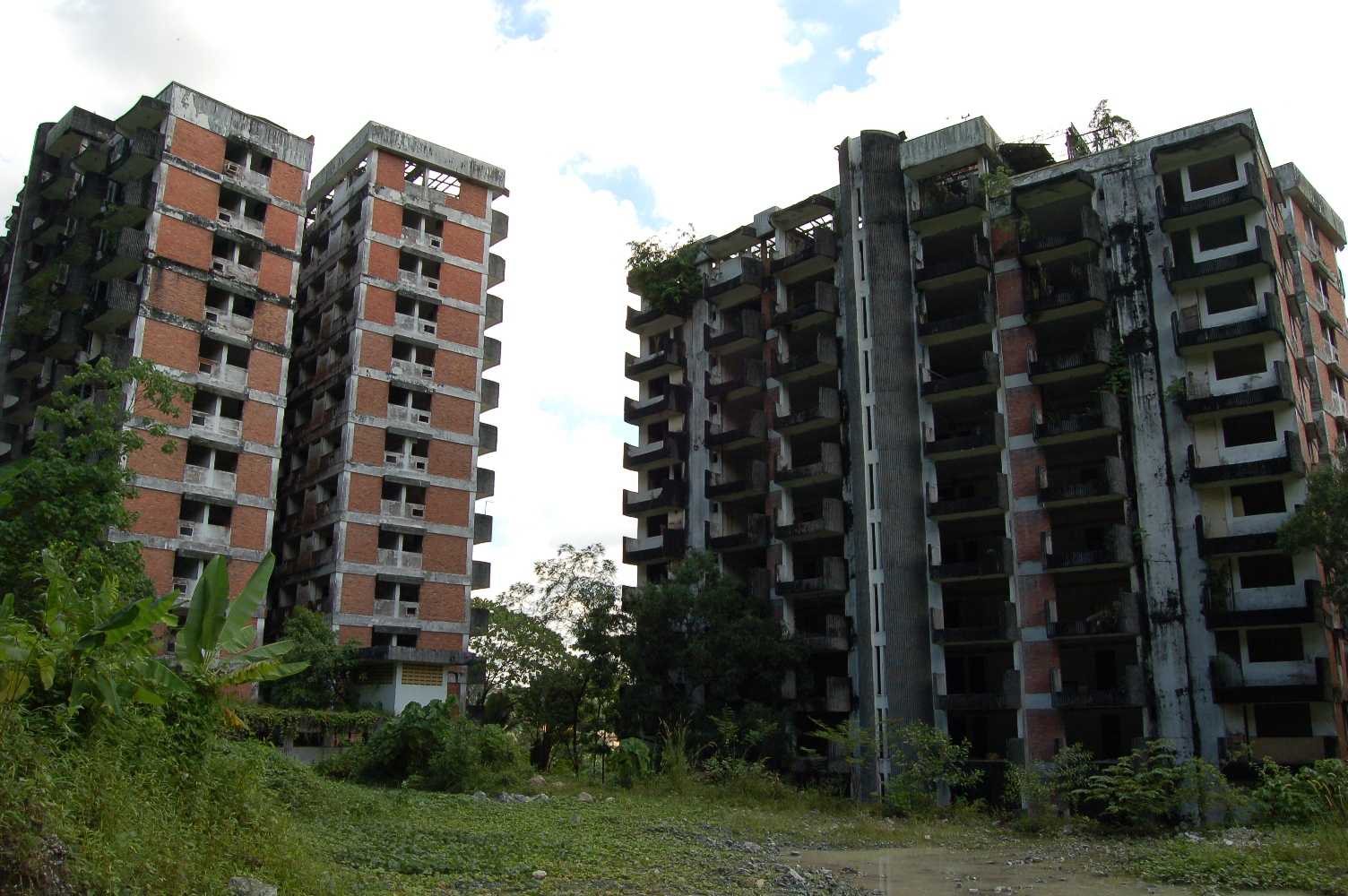
Remains of the Highland Tower, 2008

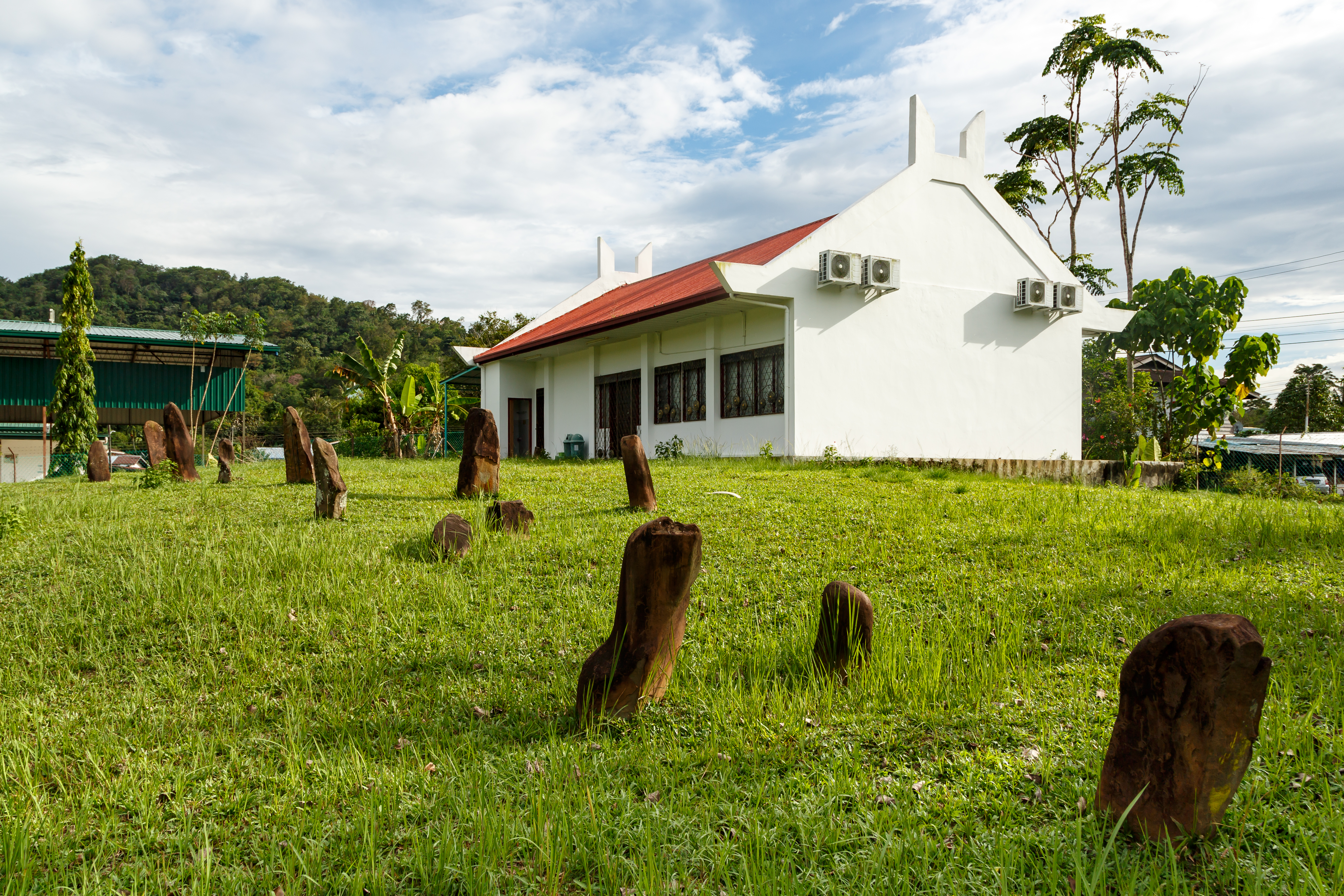
Pogunon Community Museum site, 2015

- Agnes Keith House: A house built on the site of a former house for British colonial officials. Reportedly haunted with a female apparition based on the experience of the house's former owners, including the American author named Agnes Newton Keith, the ghost is believed to be the spirit of a resident who died throughout the wartime period in the surroundings before the current house was built on the same location. The house turned into a museum in 2004.
- Amber Court: An apartment and hotel in Genting Highlands built in the 1990s. It has a notorious reputation as a haunted location with supernatural activities.
- Bukit Tunku: Previously known as Kenny Hills, Bukit Tunku is a leafy area with British colonial houses. There is a report of a phantom motorcycle and a ghost of a woman standing in the middle of the road. Local taxi drivers usually refuse to pick up women and children at night.
- Genting Highlands: Some apartments like Amber Court and Ria Apartment are reportedly haunted as well as First World Hotel, which 6,118 of its rooms are reportedly haunted due to gambling related suicides.
- Highland Towers: After a tragedy that killed 48 residents, the remaining towers were reportedly haunted as claimed by the nearest residents who live not far from there.
- Jerejak Island: The island was once quarantine centre form leprosy and tuberculosis patients in British Malaya as well as maximum security prison. There are some few reports of ghost sightings in the island.
- Kellie's Castle: A Moorish revival castle located in Batu Gajah was built by Scottish businessman William Kellie-Smith as a gift for his wife. The building remained unfinished as Kellie died of pneumonia in 1926 before the completion of the castle. It was believed the castle was haunted by alleged Indian workers who died during the construction of the castle, the castle become one of popular spot among local and international ghost hunters.
- Kinarut Mansion: A former German manor house in the Graeco-Roman style. Local population living near the area of the mansion ruins claims the place is haunted with "Hantu Tinggi", a type of Malay ghost in the form of a tall tree who is usually disguised as a normal tree in the heavily forested area. Other passerby claimed to have seen a fast moving apparition and hearing the eerie voice of a pontianak, a Malay female ghost at night which were also supported by media crews who covering information about the mansion when they felt "something" was following them through their walk in the area.
- Kuala Lumpur International Airport: The main international airport of Malaysia stands on former oil palm fields. Nighttime employees often see sightings and hear mysterious sounds. There are also reports of possession of airline staff and airport securities.
- Masjid Kampung Tedong: A new masjid in Kampung Tedong, Melaka, built in May 2016. CCTV cameras captured two wooden boards that moved themselves as if a poltergeist was manipulating them.
- Mimaland: Located in Gombak, Selangor, Mimaland used to be the largest theme park in Malaysia until it closed in 1994 due to a giant water slide incident that killed a Singaporean tourist in 1993 and a landslide within the same area that same year. Locals often reported paranormal activities around the former site of the theme park.
- Pogunon Community Museum: Various strange phenomena occur at the museum site, with a visitor who was led by the museum supervisor during a visit saying that "someone" was following behind throughout their walk, although there were actually none. A daughter of a family from Europe who came to visit also began yelling in hysteria after seeing apparition figures from centuries ago, while other group of visitors also felt the presence of some entity wandering around when they toured the site.
- Shih Chung Branch School: The building that was once school in George Town, Penang was built during the British colonial period in 1880 and later closed its door in 1994. The school was once a private residence belonged to Hokkien businessman Cheah Tek Soon until it was later converted into hotels and finally a school building. During the Japanese era, the building was used as administrative building of Japanese empire and it also rumored that many locals were tortured and executed within the school building. It was believed that the ghost of executed locals still haunt the abandoned building as well as ghost of Japanese soldiers patrolling the building. Some ghost hunters reported that they have experienced psychological effects with some illness symptoms when entering the old building.
- Tambun Inn: Located in Ipoh, it is one of the top tourist destinations in Malaysia, and is reported to be haunted by many ghostly apparitions. Some of these accounts mention lights turning on and off, sounds of whispers and eerie cries, as well as a report of the ghost of an old woman spotted within the vicinity of the inn.

== Malta ==
- Fort St. Angelo: Said to be haunted by the "Grey Lady", a concubine of a Sicilian-era governor who was killed after she protested against her marital status.
- Grandmaster's Palace, Valletta: Said to be haunted by ghosts taking the forms of cats and dogs.
- Manoel Island: Said to be haunted by the "Black Knight", a spirit dressed in full armour and regalia of the Knights Hospitaller.
- Russian Cultural Centre, Valletta: Formerly the residence of a British colonial secretary, residents and neighbours noted sounds of banqueting at night.
- Verdala Palace: Said to be haunted by the "Blue Lady", a niece of Grand Master Emmanuel de Rohan-Polduc who fell to her death while escaping an arranged marriage while wearing a blue dress.

== Monaco ==
- A yacht once belonging to Errol Flynn, the USS Zaca, is berthed here and is supposed to be haunted. Witnesses have reported seeing Flynn's ghost pacing aboard. Others have described the sounds of voices and laughter as if a wild party were happening on board.

== Myanmar ==
- Amazing Kengtung Resort: A former royal palace turned hotel in Kengtung, previously known as Kyaing Tong New Hotel, once belonged to the local ruling prince. Today, it has been renovated into a hotel open to the public. However, many guests have reported ghostly encounters during their stays. Some claim to have seen a woman with striking red fingernails, while others speak of an apparition dressed in traditional Shan attire.

== Netherlands ==
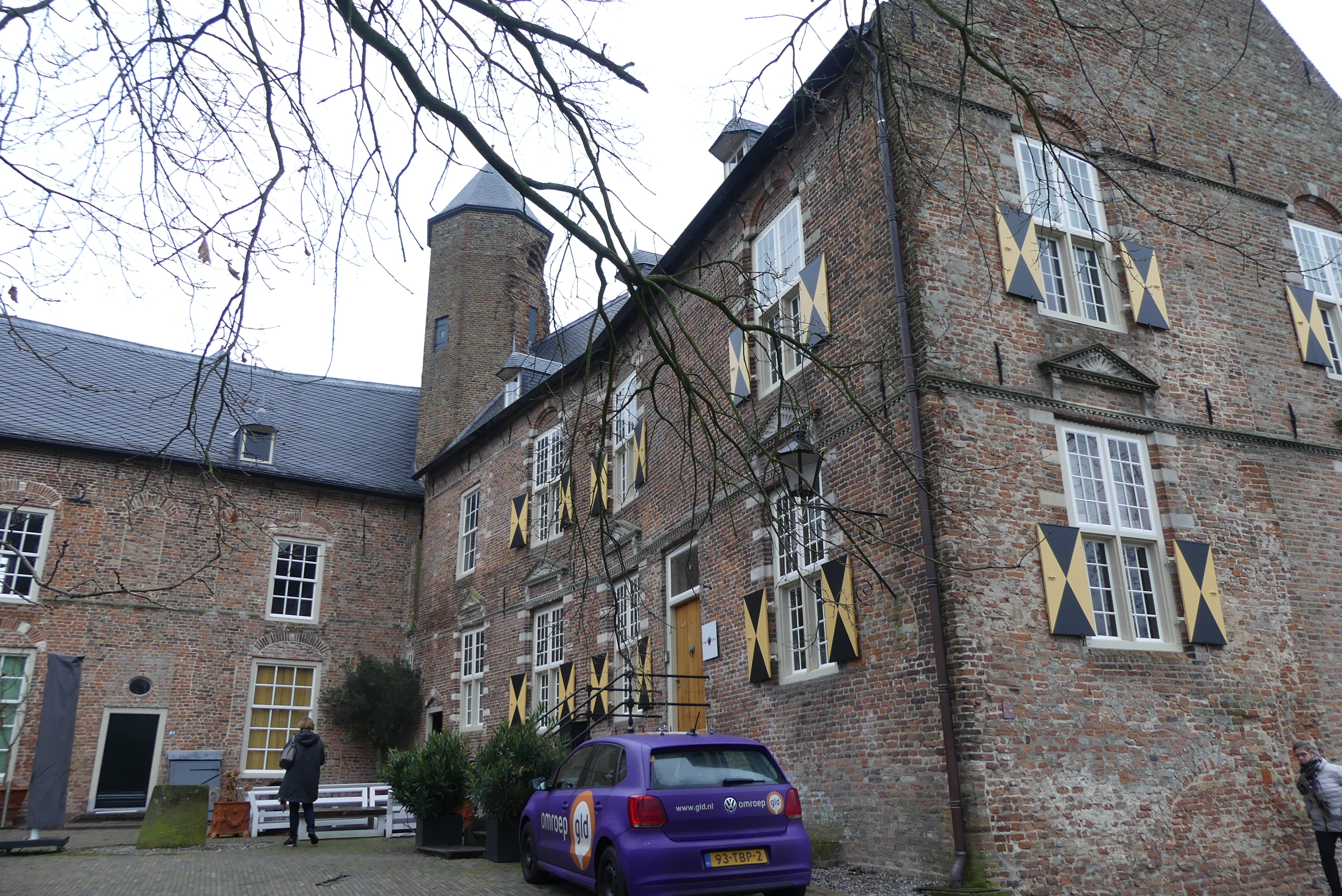
Kasteel Waardenburg

- Binnenveld mansion is a rijksmonument located in Huissen, in the province of Gelderland. The mansion is better known as the 'haunted house of Huissen'. This building stood in the front area during the Battle of Arnhem (a major battle of World War II). According to locals, this house is haunted.

== New Zealand ==
- Larnach Castle, on Otago Peninsula, is said to be haunted by at least one, and possibly two ghosts: that of Kate, daughter of the mansion's original owner, William Larnach; and that of Larnach's first wife, Eliza.
- The Vulcan Hotel, in Saint Bathans, Otago is reputedly haunted by the ghost of a nineteenth-century prostitute, "The Rose".

== Norway ==
- Lier Sykehus: An old insane asylum situated in Drammen, where people claim to have seen ghosts, shadows and apparitions.

== Oman ==
- Bahla: A town located in Oman. In neighboring Gulf countries and Oman itself, there are rumors of Bahla being home to jinns, which are same as genies in English.

== Pakistan ==
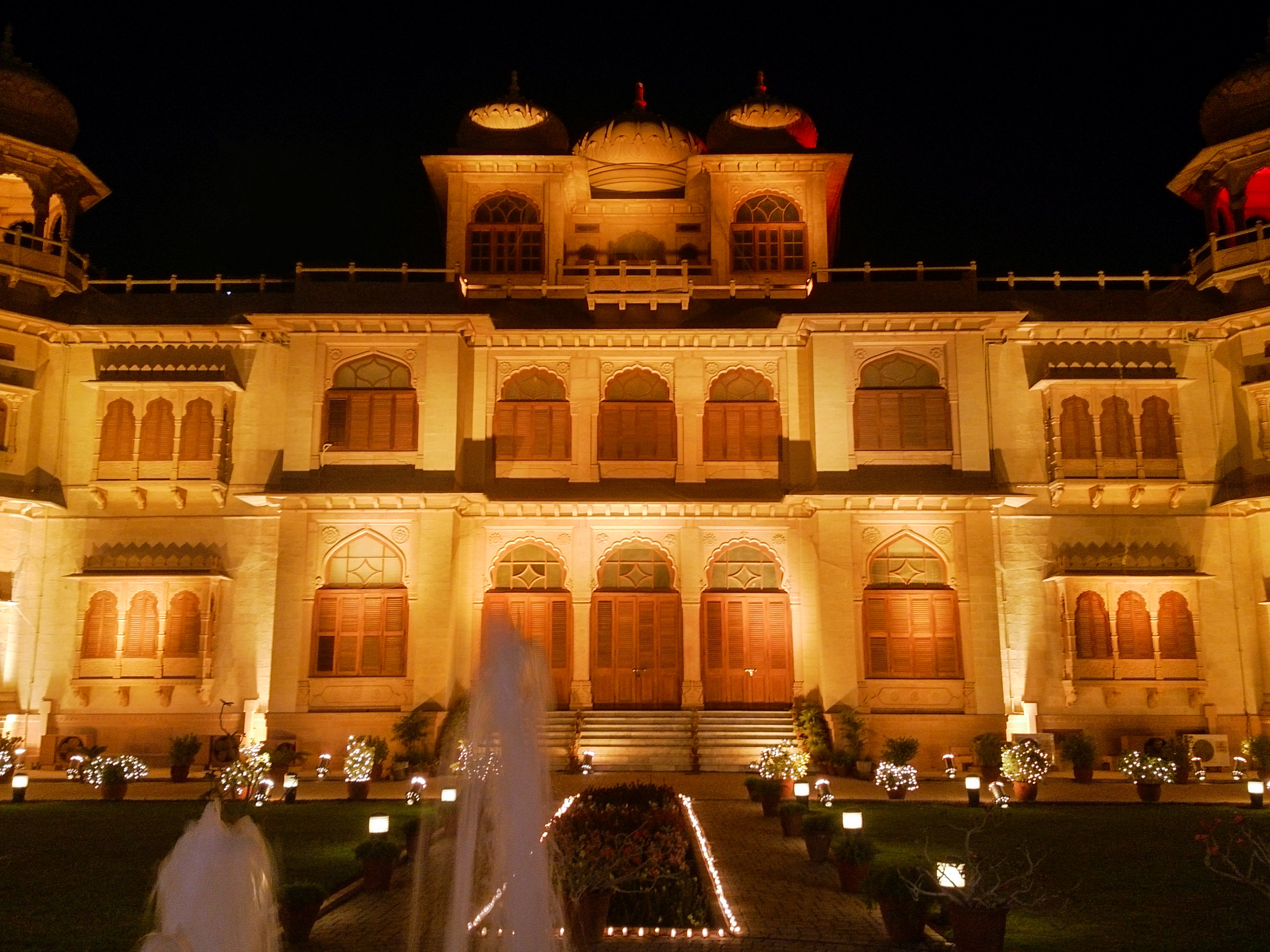
Mohatta Palace

- The Chaukhandi Tombs: Chokundi Graveyard situated near Karachi is an ancient burial ground dating back to the 15th century. The intricately carved tombstones are a testament to the region’s rich history. However it is also considered one of the most haunted places in Pakistan.
- The Koh-i-Chiltan peak: This mountain in Balochistan is described, according to a local myth and the legend associated with it, as being haunted by the "... spirits of forty babies."
- The Mohatta Palace in Karachi: Said to be haunted by ghosts of the British Raj era. Museum guides have reportedly seen various objects which have moved from their original place, or shifted about while guards have claimed to have "felt" the presence of certain spirits during the night.

== Panama ==
- Coiba: The largest island in the Central American region. Formerly the site of a large prison, built in 1919. During the military regime of the dictator Manuel Noriega, it was used as a penal colony for political subversives, commonly referred to as Los Desaparacidos ("The Disappeared"). At its peak, Coiba held 3000 inmates. The prison ceased operation in 2004.

== Poland ==
- Haunted house in Jeleń (part of Jaworzno city). Several families left this place, complaining of noises in the night and items thrown about by a poltergeist. The current owner offers adventure seekers an opportunity to stay in the house overnight (however, only groups of at least two people are accepted).
- An unfinished house at Kosocicka St. in Kraków. According to the story known by locals, the house was located on a former cemetery ground. Construction started in the 1970s as an investment made by two brothers, but stopped after one of them killed the other in the house. After that the property was bought by another owner, who, for unknown reasons, committed suicide in the house at night, at the 3rd floor. Locals claim that ghosts appear in the house.
- The castle of Ogrodzieniec. Allegedly, the castle is guarded by a ghost of a giant black dog, as well as by three human ghosts.
- Abandoned hospital in Olesno.
- Anachów, abandoned village in Prudnik County, Opole Voivodeship.
- Bromierzyk, abandoned village in Warsaw West County, Masovian Voivodeship. It is often referred to as wieś wisielców (the hangman village). Supposedly, during World War II, the German soldiers assassinated many of the village's residents. Because of this, allegedly it is haunted by ghosts and several strange sounds could be heard.

== Portugal ==
- The Beau-Séjour Palace, in Lisbon, is said to be haunted by the Baron of Glória, who lived in the palace during the 19th century. Employees working at the palace report moving and disappearing objects and windows opening and closing abruptly. Visitors to the gardens also report hearing the ringing of non-existent bells.
- The Castelinho de São João do Estoril, in Estoril, is said to be haunted by the ghost of a little blind girl who accidentally fell to her death in a nearby cliff.
- The Quinta da Juncosa, in Penafiel, is said to be haunted by the Baron of Lages and his family. Suspecting that his wife was unfaithful to him, the baron reportedly tied her to one of his horse's legs and dragged her across the floor, killing her. After finding that she was innocent, he proceeded to kill his children and commit suicide. Locals have reported seeing the ghost of the baron several times over the years.

== Russia ==
- Far Eastern Federal University, Vladivostok: The university's dormitory on Russky Island is said by students to be haunted by ghosts that pound on walls and bite feet.

== Saint Kitts and Nevis ==
- Eden Brown Estate, Nevis: A ruined plantation said to be haunted by the ghost of an heiress who died unmarried after her fiancé and would-be best man killed each other in a duel on the eve of her wedding.

== Senegal ==
- Sarpan Island: Part of the Îles de la Madeleine, it is said to be haunted by spirits who disrupt attempts to build man-made structures.

== Serbia ==
- Petrovaradin Fortress, Novi Sad: Said to be haunted by the ghosts of soldiers who died in battle.

== Singapore ==
- Bedok: A planning area in the southeastern coast of Singapore, which is famous for its paranormal activities. There are numerous reports of suicide or murder-suicide around the residential areas. The most famous paranormal activity in the area is the ghost of a woman and her 3-year-old child. She allegedly died by jumping from the HDB (government high-rise flat), after throwing her child. But before she did that, she wrote "It's not over, darling" on the wall with her own blood in Mandarin. Residents claim they hear female laughter and wailing near the unit.
- East Coast Park: One night in May 1990, a young couple was having a date at the park's Amber Beacon Tower. It was at this tower where two men attacked them, knocking the boyfriend, 22-year-old James Soh Fook Leong, unconscious and killing the 21-year-old girlfriend Kelly Tan Ah Hong. After this particular incident, known as the Amber Beacon Tower murder, there have been people claiming to have seen a female figure, allegedly the ghost of the murdered victim, near the tower, and there were also alleged screams of help resonating from the area. The murder itself remains unsolved as of today.
- Old Changi Hospital: The vacated hospital compound was popular with movie-makers after the Singapore Land Authority commenced short term rental of the buildings and is often listed as one of Singapore's most haunted locations due to its history. A former British military hospital, its reputation as a haunted location likely stems from the Japanese occupation, when the Kempeitai used its premises as a prison camp and reportedly turned some of the rooms into a torture chamber.
- Pasir Ris Park: One of the white sand beaches of Singapore. It is a place where it has been reported that a haunted place is a hotspot where women commit suicide. Nowadays, it is very popular among the ghost hunters.
- Spooner Road: Surrounded by various HDB flats (government high-rise flat), these HDB flats were formerly used for the railway employees who worked at the former Tanjong Pagar Railway Station. After the railway station closed down, the flats were abandoned for a period of time. The flats were eventually used for low cost housing. However, current and former residents claimed they saw moving shadows, items moving, ghost sightings and heard unexplained noises.

== South Korea ==
- Gonjiam Psychiatric Hospital: Famous for its very dark past among ghost hunters in Seoul. This abandoned hospital in Gwangju, Gyeonggi is claimed to be the most haunted place in Korea. The once psychiatric hospital is home to many rumors of ghosts. Over 2.6 million people watched a horror film dealing with poltergeist phenomena in Gonjiam. Gonjiam hospital has since been demolished as of 28 May 2018.
- Korean Folk Village: This popular tourist attraction located in Yongin, Gyeonggi province has been reported to have witnessed Gwisin, a vengeful ghost in Korean folklore.

== Spain ==
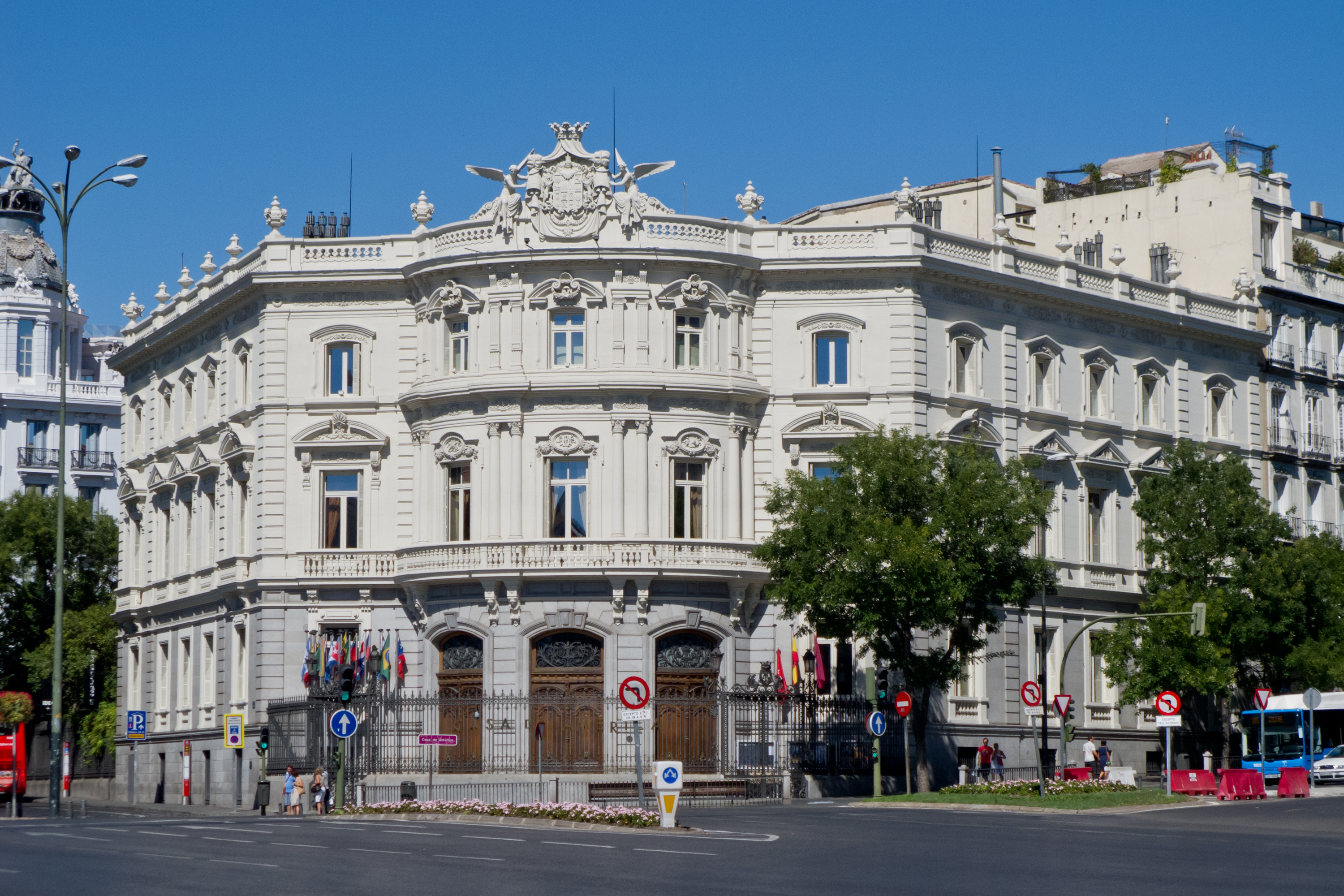
Palace of Linares

- Barranco de Badajoz (Tenerife) - According to witnesses, various spectral apparitions take place there. The legend of the Niña de las Peras takes place in this place.
- Casa Fuset or Casa de Franco (Tenerife) - In the property there are many cabalistic and satanic symbols painted on the walls. It is claimed that satanic rituals are performed in it, that shots are heard at night and psychophonies are obtained.
- Museum of the History of Tenerife - Located in the city of San Cristóbal de La Laguna, in it the ghost of Catalina Lercaro appears, who according to legend committed suicide by throwing herself into a well of her mansion when she was forced to marry a man whom she did not love.
- Palace of Linares in Madrid: Built between 1872 and 1890 for the Marquis of Linares José de Murga. According to legend this place is the most haunted in Spain. Supposedly, a little girl appears in the mansion, the Marquis fathered her with his sister and they murdered her in order to hide their incestuous relationship.

== Sweden ==
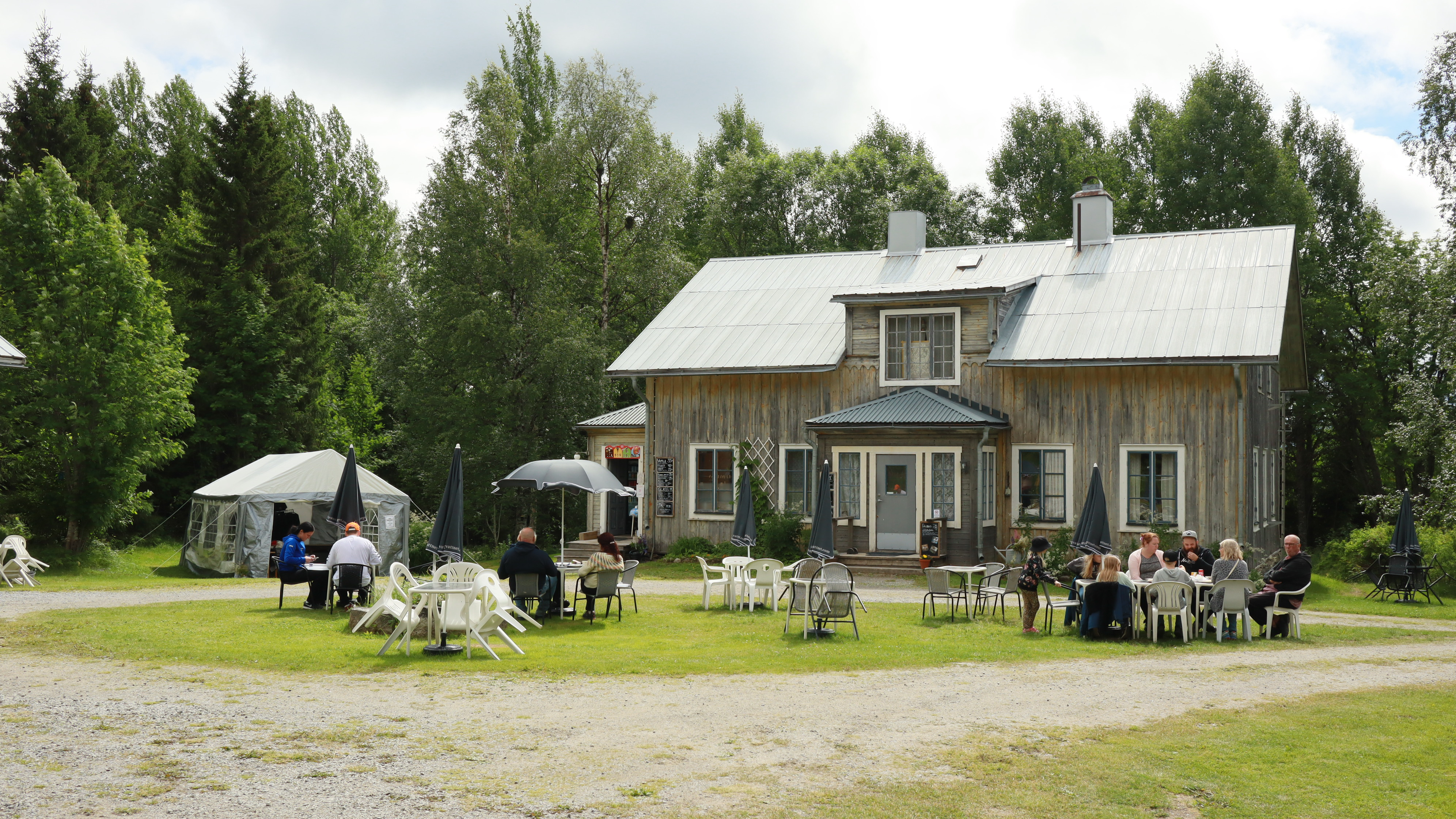
Borgvattnet Prästgard

- Borgvattnets Prästgård: The rectory of the small village of Borgvattnet in Jämtland, where there have been reports of hauntings since the early 1920s. On 2 December 1947, Bishop Torsten Bohlin revealed plans to "order a scientific investigation of the vicarage after several years of ghosts". The Church of Sweden confirmed ghosts and Borgvattnet immediately became world famous. Today, the rectory is open to the public in summer, and people can spend nights in the house for a small fee (which benefits the village).

== Switzerland ==
- The house located in Junkerngasse no 54 in Bern is the subject of a number of stories about its haunting.

== Taiwan ==
- Chiayi Min-Hsiung Haunted House: Located in Chiayi City, it was once the residence of the Liu family. It is probably one of the most recognized haunted house in Taiwan.
- Grand Hyatt Taipei: The hotel that is located in Xinyi District, Taipei was believed to be haunted. The site of the hotel was believed by the locals to be a former Japanese concentration camp and believed to be haunted by former prisoners. It was believed that two big talisman-like paintings in the lobby was displayed on purpose to calm the spirits
- Sanzhi UFO houses: The UFO houses were constructed beginning in 1978. They were intended as a vacation resort in a part of the northern coast adjacent to Tamsui, and were marketed towards U.S. military officers coming from their East Asian postings. However, the project was never completed in 1980 due to investment losses and several car accident deaths and suicides during construction, which is said to have been caused by the inauspicious act of bisecting the Chinese dragon sculpture located near the resort gates for widening the road to the buildings. Other stories indicated that the site was the former burial ground for Dutch soldiers. The last standing UFO houses have been completely demolished.

== United Arab Emirates ==
- Al Jazirah Al Hamra: An abandoned fishing village near Ras al-Khaimah which is believed to be haunted by the presence of supernatural jinns.

== Vietnam ==
- 300 Kim Mã in Hanoi is a building which was proposed to be the Bulgarian Embassy, but was abandoned for unknown reasons. After a murder near this building, the story of mysterious phenomena including the ghost of a Western man is popularised across the nation. Now it is the property of the Vietnamese government.
- Côn Đảo: The unfinished stone bridge deep in the jungle, known as "Ma Thiên Lãnh Bridge" or locally as the "Ghostly Bridge," was built by more than 300 prisoners who endured extreme suffering and died under French colonial rule. One villager reported seeing a long-haired male ghost in a white shirt and black pants watching him while he was drinking with a friend — before vanishing. Another female villager claimed she saw a woman in a white dress standing alone on the bridge at dawn, whom she immediately recognized as a hungry ghost. Yet another woman said she encountered the spirits of two shirtless boys who demanded that she give them dessert.
- The Hui Mansion (now Ho Chi Minh City Museum of Fine Arts): One of the most mysterious places in Ho Chi Minh City, located at 97 Phó Đức Chính Street, District 1. People believe that the mansion is haunted by the ghost of Hui Bon Hoa's leper daughter.
- 727 Tran Hung Dao, one of the reportedly haunted buildings located in Ho Chi Minh City. It was built in 1960 by a Vietnamese businessman, Nguyễn Tấn Đời.

== See also ==
- Ghost hunting
- Haunted house
- List of ghosts
- List of ghost films
- List of Ghost Adventures episodes (includes lists of reportedly haunted locations mostly in the United States that have been investigated)
- List of Ghost Hunters episodes (includes lists of reportedly haunted locations in the United States that have been investigated)
- List of Most Haunted episodes (includes lists of reportedly haunted locations in the United Kingdom and Ireland that have been investigated)
- List of reportedly haunted paintings

== Bibliography ==
- Wicaksono, Teguh (September 2013). "Dicekam Seram di Benteng Pendem" [Gripped by Fright in Benteng Pendem]. National Geographic Traveler (in Indonesian). Archived from the original on 7 April 2015.
