= 727 Tran Hung Dao =

Building claimed to be haunted in Ho Chi Minh City, Vietnam

- Chung cư 727 Trần Hưng Đạo
- 727 Trần Hưng Đạo Building in 2015
- Alternative names: Saigon Building, President Building

General information
- Status: Demolished
- Type: Non-government
- Architectural style: Modernist
- Location: Chợ Lớn, 727 Trần Hưng Đạo Boulevard, Chợ Quán, District 5, Ho Chi Minh City, Vietnam
- Coordinates: 10.755715°N 106.682832°E
- Completed: 1960
- Demolished: Late 2016-2017
- Owner: Nguyễn Tấn Đời

Height
- Height: 48.94 m (160.6 ft)

Technical details
- Floor count: 13

Design and construction
- Known for: Haunted place

The 727 Tran Hung Dao apartment, also known as Saigon or President Building, was a reportedly haunted building located in Ho Chi Minh City. It was also used by the American soldiers on rent during the Vietnam War.

It was originally commissioned by Nguyễn Tấn Đời, a Vietnamese businessman. The building with 530 rooms was divided into 6 blocks and 13 floors. The building was completed in 1960.

== History ==
The building had thirteen floors which, according to local folklore and media reports, allegedly killed workers during its construction process due to "bad luck" believed to be caused by the unlucky number, 13.

Later, the architectural engineers called a shaman to address the fear of evil spirit or bad luck. Shaman, according to local legends, brought the deceased bodies of four virgins from a "local hospital and buried them at the four corners of the building", in order to avoid any harm from evil spirits.

It is believed the local residents often hear screams of horror, the sound of a military parade, in addition to unexpected sights of spectral G.I. walking with a Vietnamese girlfriend.

A French architect had warned Đời about the building's unpromising structure such as "13 floors". Prior to its completion, workers witnessed frequent spiritual incidents associated with "the number 13". When the building was completed, US troops stayed in the building on rent.

After the war ended, some Vietnamese families stayed in the building, and since then local residents have reportedly heard screams and the sounds of a military parade.

=== Later development ===
In 2016 or earlier, the local authorities of Ho Chi Minh City stated site clearance in the city, including 727 Tran Hung Dao. They removed households from the apartment, however ten families refused to leave the site because the compensation rate provided by the authorities was allegedly low. Most of the locals here have moved into the nearby 109 Nguyễn Biểu apartment.

== In popular culture ==
The building has been featured in movies, some notable are Scandal (2012) and Cho Lon (2013). The building also made appearance in Block B's "Nillili Mambo" 2012 music video, a single from the Blockbuster album.
