= Old City of Luxembourg =

City of Luxembourg: its Old Quarters and Fortifications
UNESCO World Heritage Site
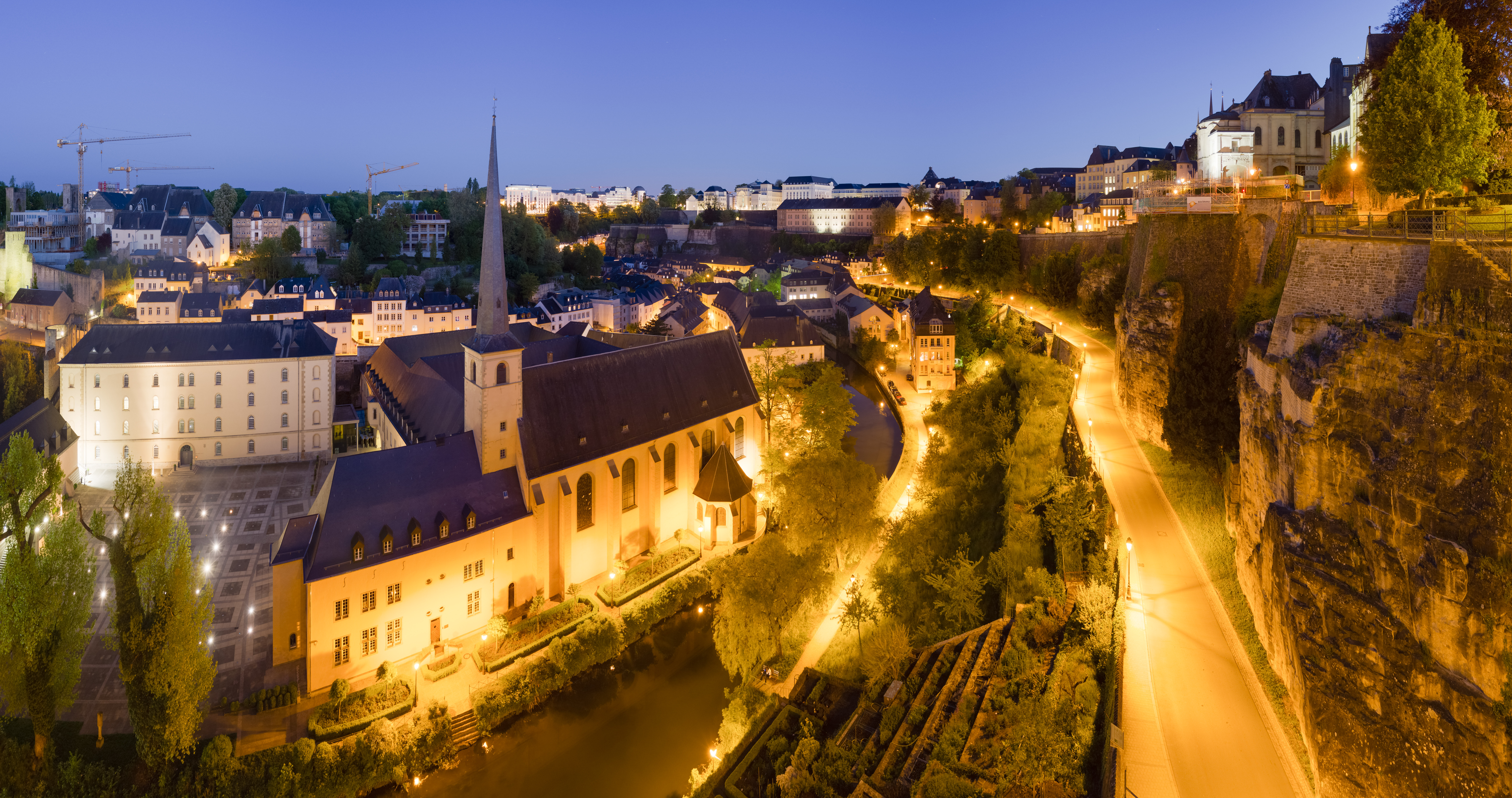
- Interactive map of City of Luxembourg: its Old Quarters and Fortifications
- Location: Luxembourg City, canton of Luxembourg Luxembourg
- Criteria: Cultural: iv
- Reference: 699
- Inscription: 1994 (18th Session)
- Area: 29.94 ha (74.0 acres)
- Buffer zone: 108.73 ha (268.7 acres)
- Coordinates: 49.611°N 6.130°E

The Old City of Luxembourg is located mainly in Ville Haute (Uewerstad) in Luxembourg City, Grand Duchy of Luxembourg. The site was added as City of Luxembourg: its Old Quarters and Fortifications to the UNESCO World Heritage list in 1994. The origin of the city was a fort built in the 10th century and had to be demolished in most parts in the 19th century (the casemates, the bastion and some walls still exist partly). The early town (which is now the historical city) has been established in the 12th century.

Highlights are Grand Ducal Palace, Notre-Dame Cathedral, Adolphe Bridge, Dräi Tierm, Pont du Château, Chemin de la Corniche, and Bock casemates.

The Ministry of Culture, Department of National Sites and Monuments is responsible for the preservation of the sites (with a partnership of the Luxembourg Commission for Cooperation with UNESCO which was founded in 1949).

== Gallery ==
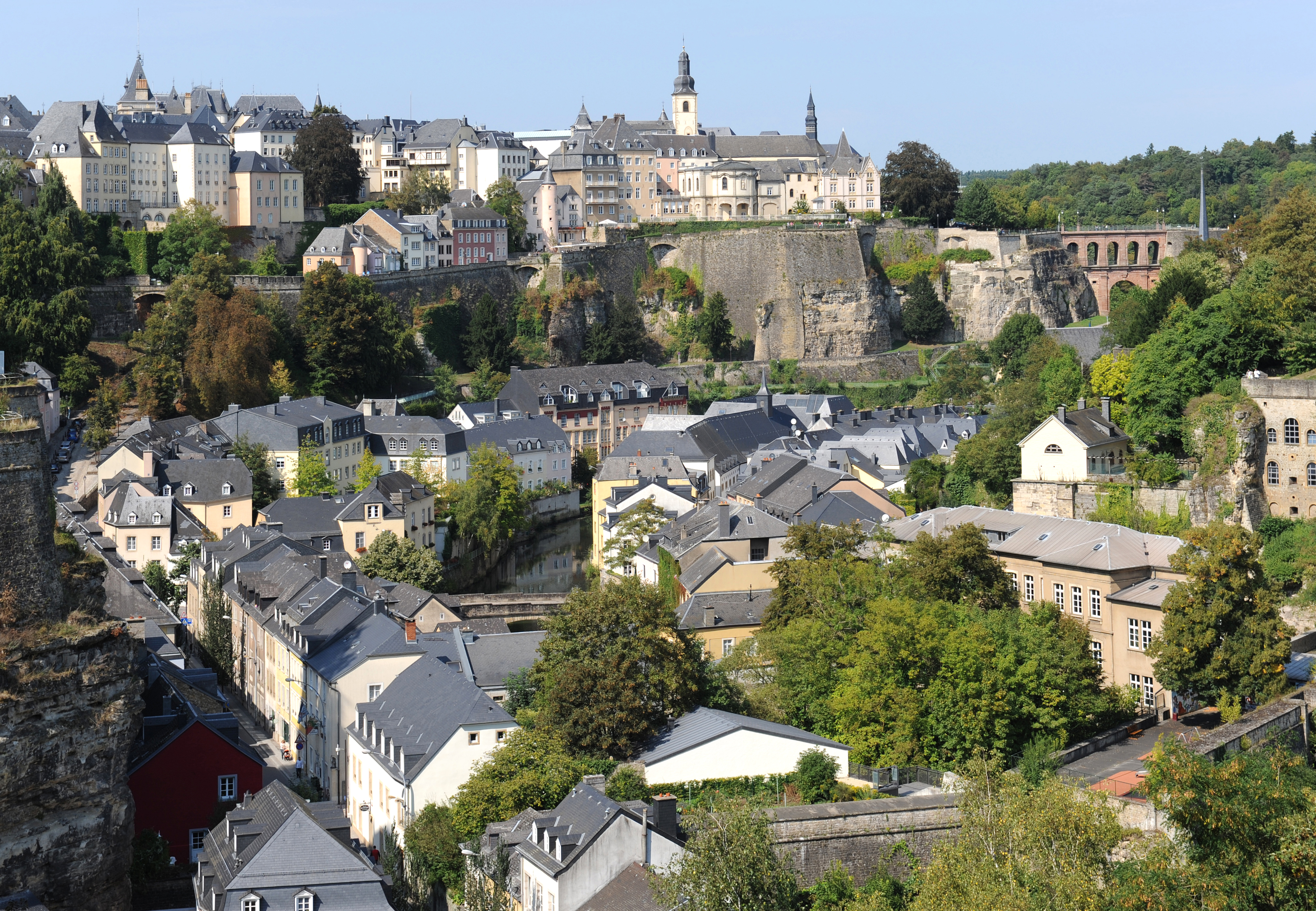
Grund

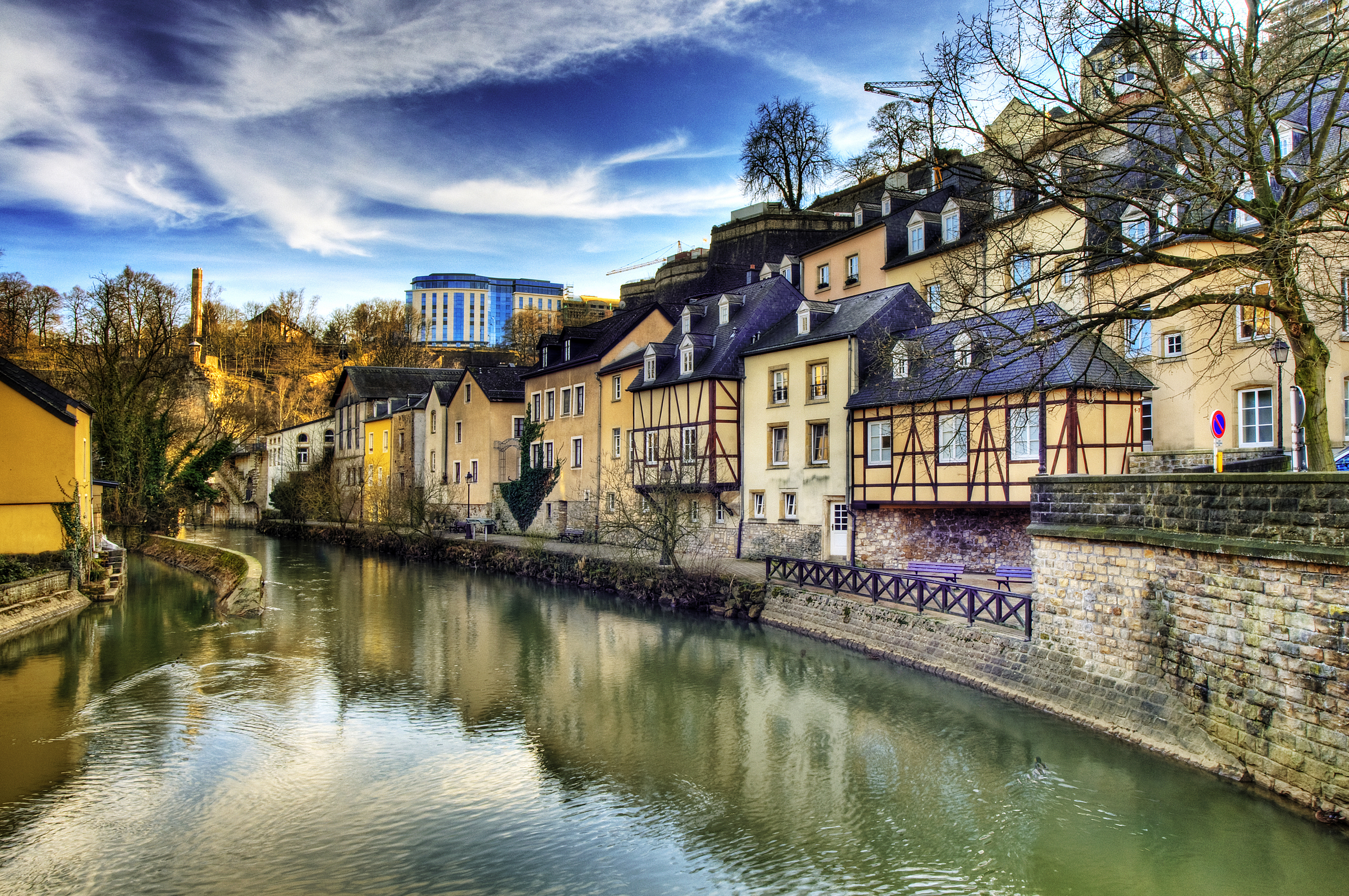
River Alzette

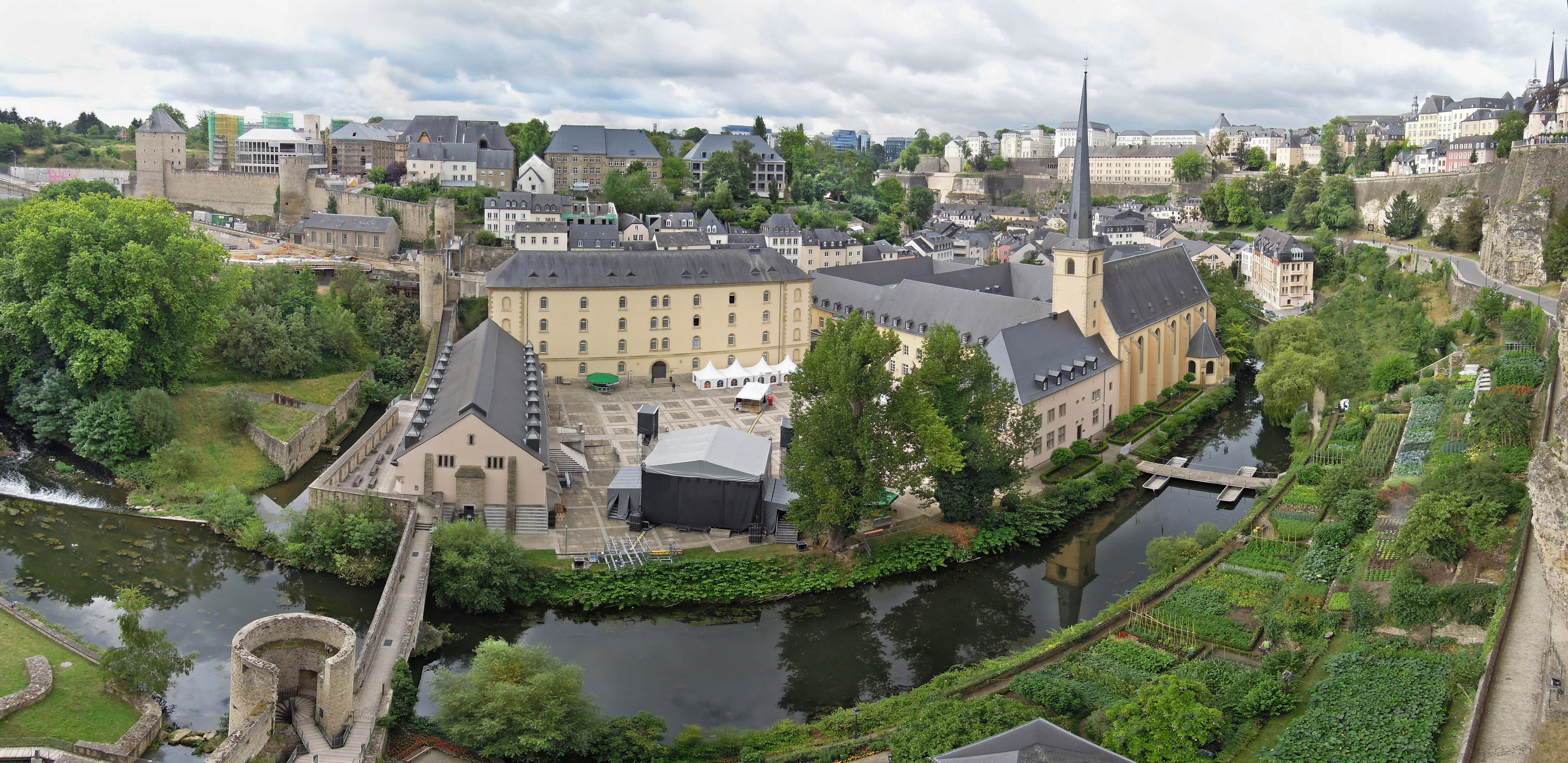
Église Saint-Jean (Neumünster)

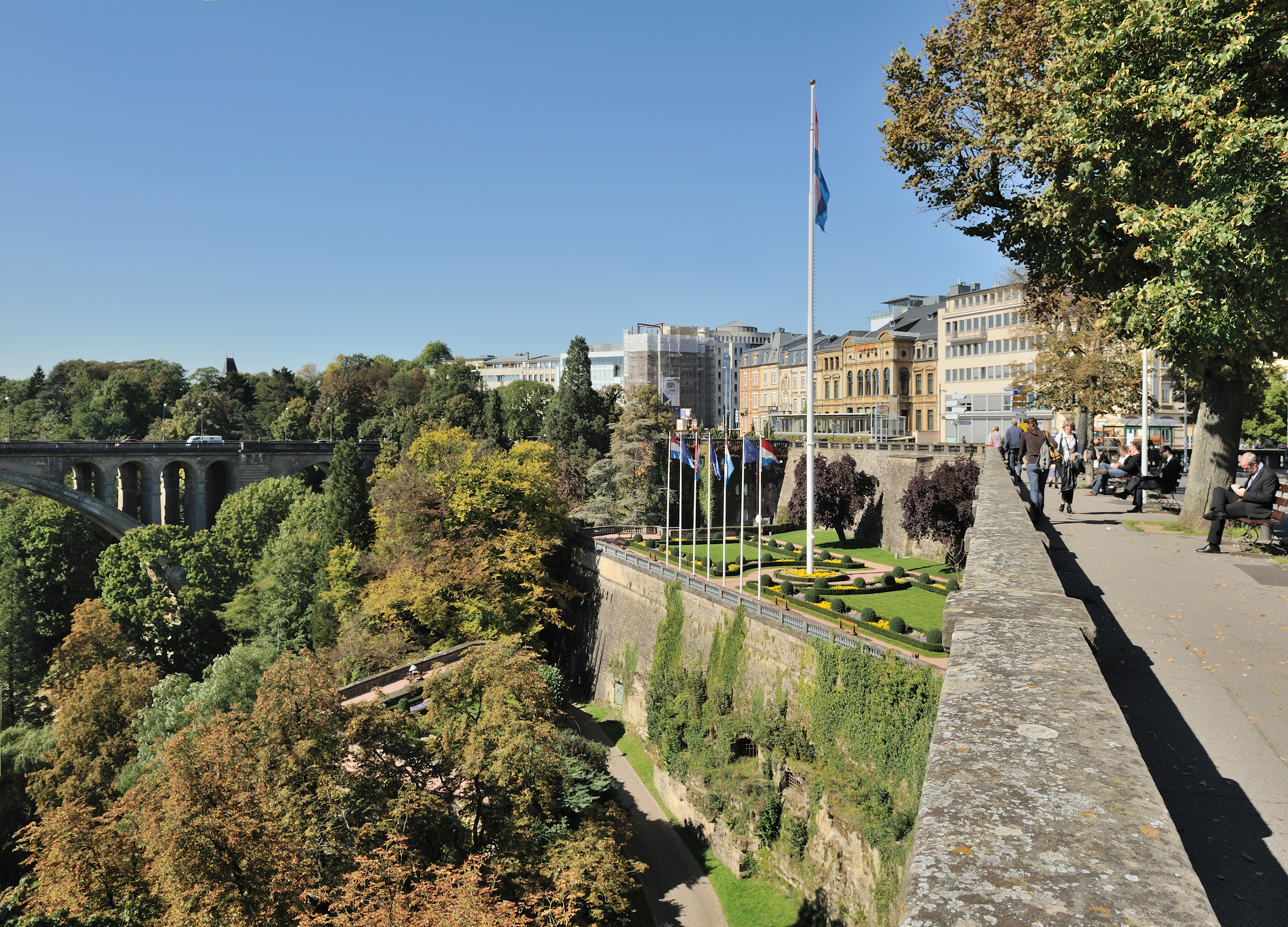
The gorges and Adolphe Bridge

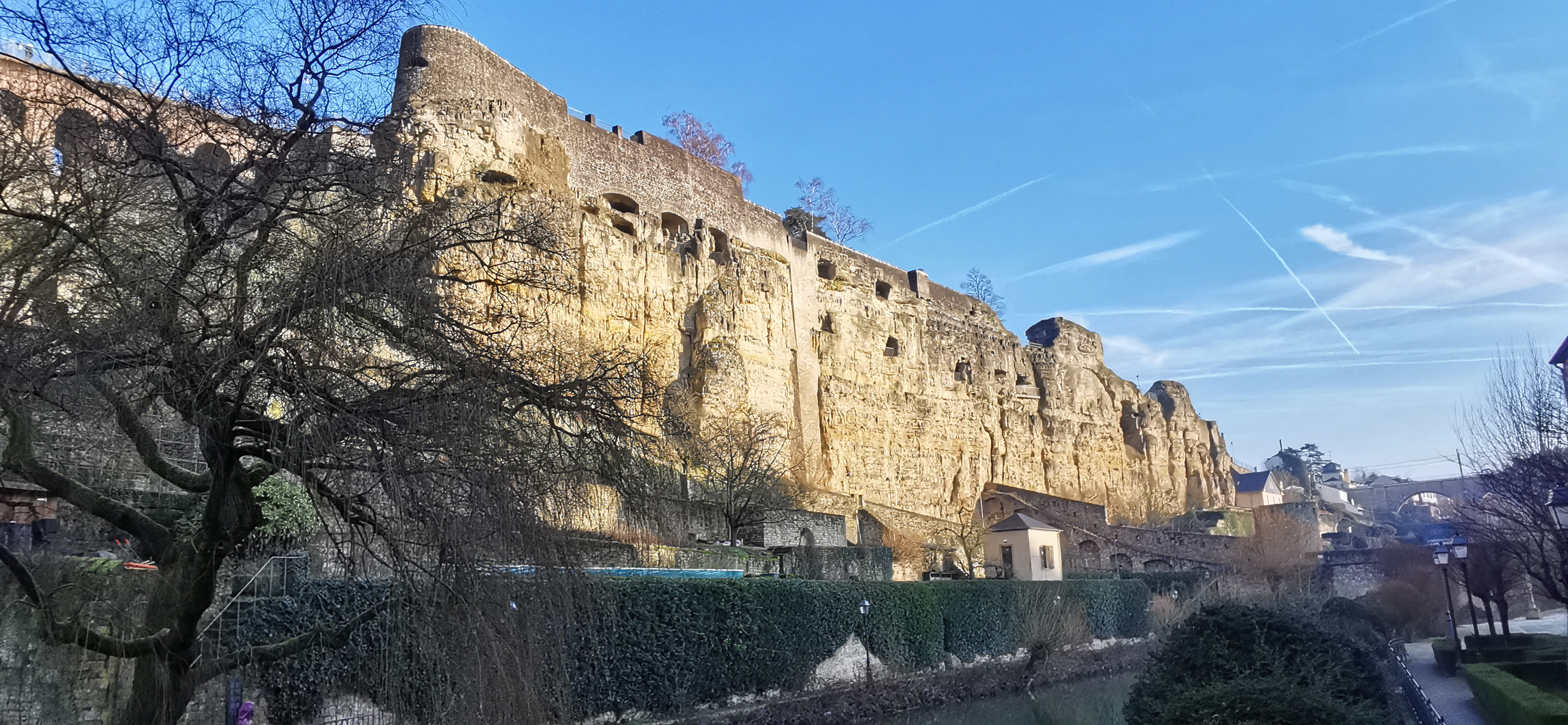
Bock Casemates (Bockfiels)
