= Pogunon Community Museum =

Museum in Sabah, Malaysia

- Muzium Komuniti Pogunon
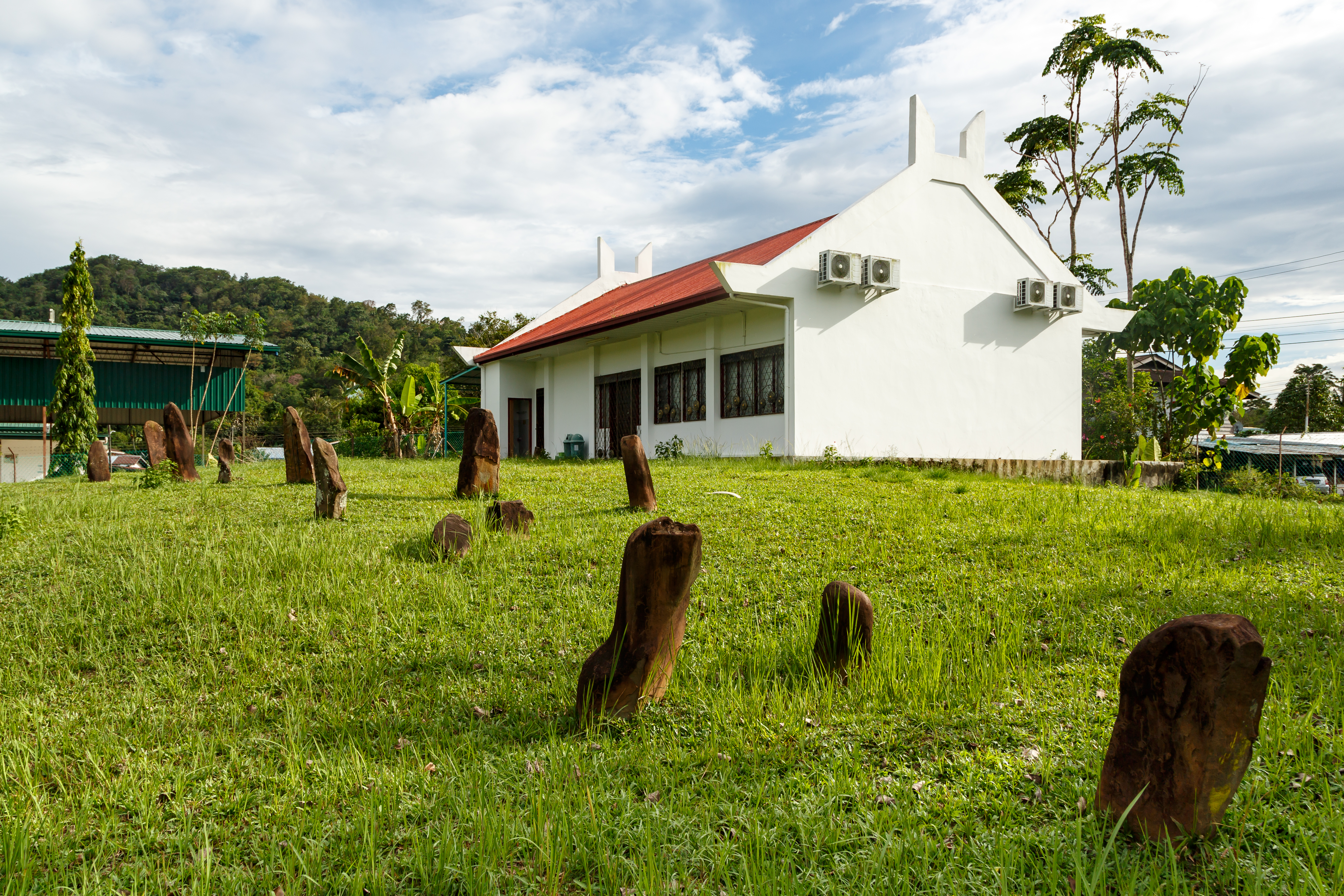
- Established: 2004
- Location: Penampang District, Sabah
- Coordinates: 5°54′48″N 116°08′42″E
- Type: Museum
- Owner: Sabah Museum

Pogunon Community Museum (Malay: Muzium Komuniti Pogunon) is a museum located at Pogunon Village in Penampang District of Sabah, Malaysia.

== History ==
During the construction of a village kindergarten building in Pogunon in 2000, several ancient artefacts comprising three whole jars, pieces of four jars of blue and white plates including bowls were accidentally unearthed. Inside the three jars were human remains with ceramics found in the site were originated from China and made between the 16th to 19th centuries. A further thirteen ancient burial jars were also unearthed from an old graveyard in front of a St Joseph Chapel in the same village. One of the broken jars consisted of human bones and various artefacts such as coins dating back to 1885, a bangle and belt made from ancient silver coins were also found in the jar which however was broken by an excavator during the discovery. The area with stone markers (megaliths) is located in the front site of the recent museum which established in 2004.

== Haunted reputation ==
Many strange phenomena occur at the museum site, with a visitor who was led by the museum supervisor during a visit saying that "someone" was following behind throughout their walk, although there were actually none. A daughter of a family from Europe who came to visit also began yelling in hysteria after seeing apparition figures from centuries ago, while other group of visitors also felt the presence of some entity wandering around when they toured the site.

== Features ==
Three large pots with human skeletal remains are being showcased inside the museum to visitors. Several other potteries discovered on Pogunon were kept by Sabah Museum due to size constraints at the community museum. The ceramic jars displayed inside the museum are believed to be the burial jars of people who once hold high status in Kadazan society while located near the museum are cemetery with vertical stones as grave markers with some of the deceased were bobohizan's.

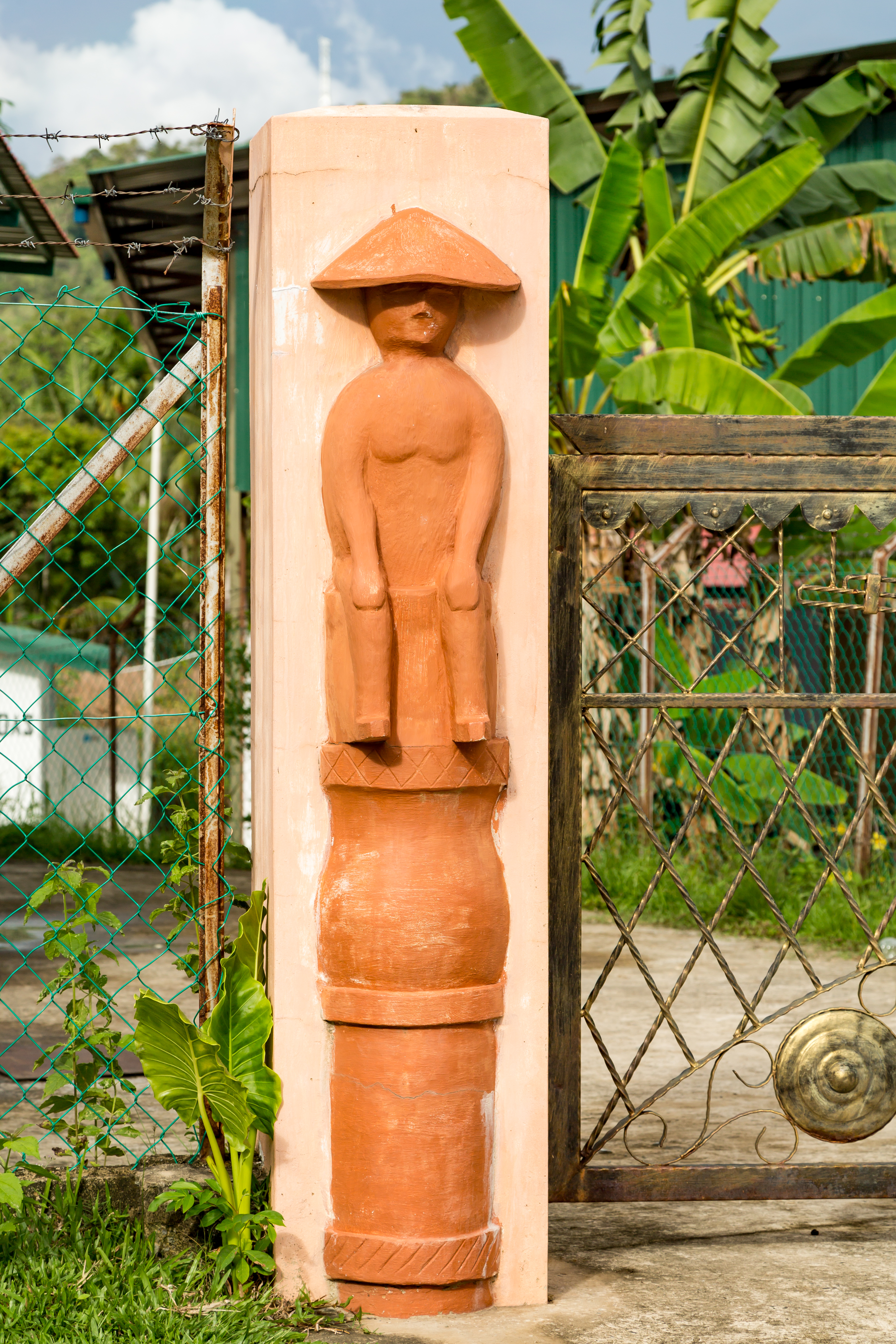
Decoration at the entrance of the museum.

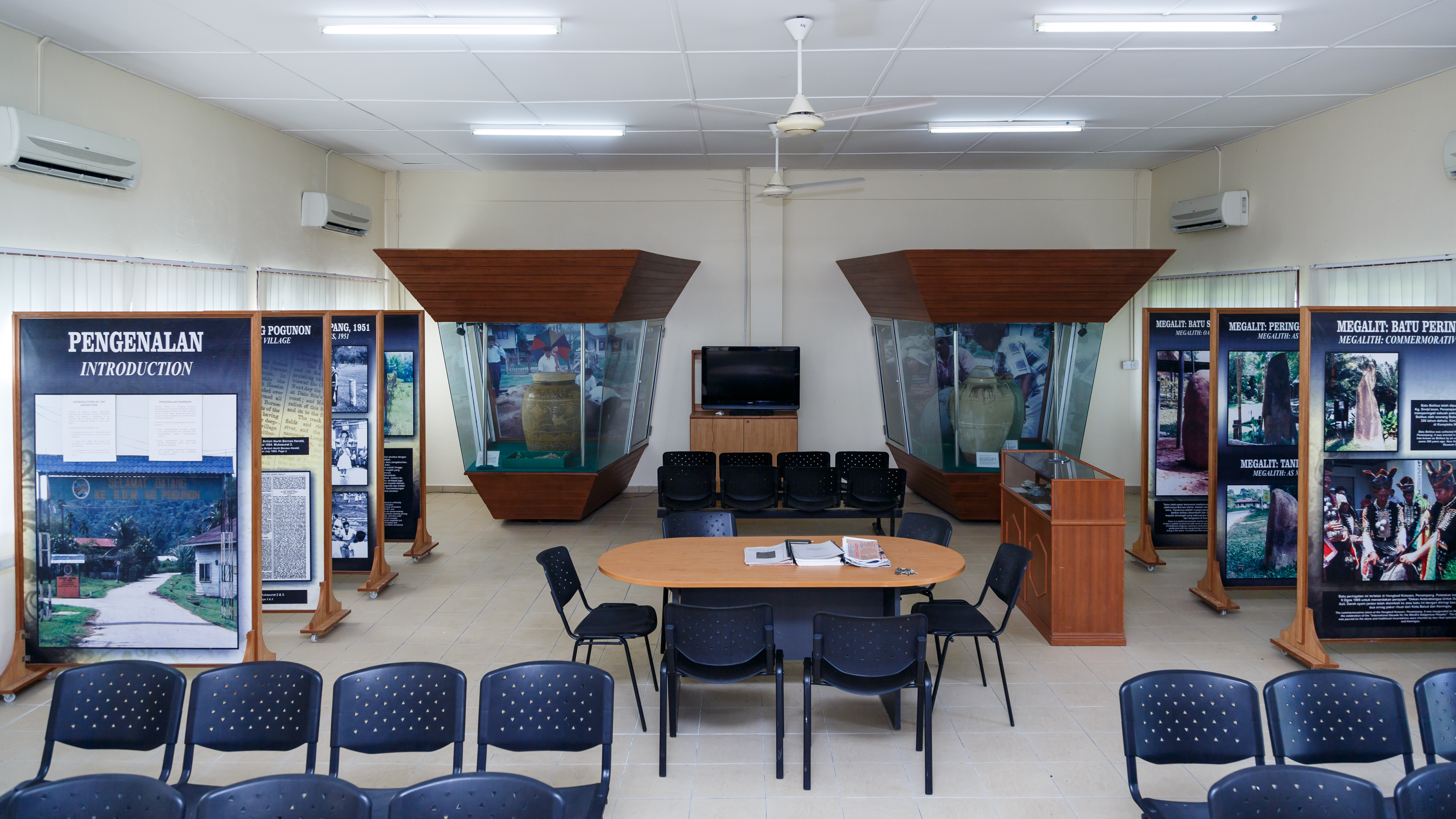
Inside the museum.

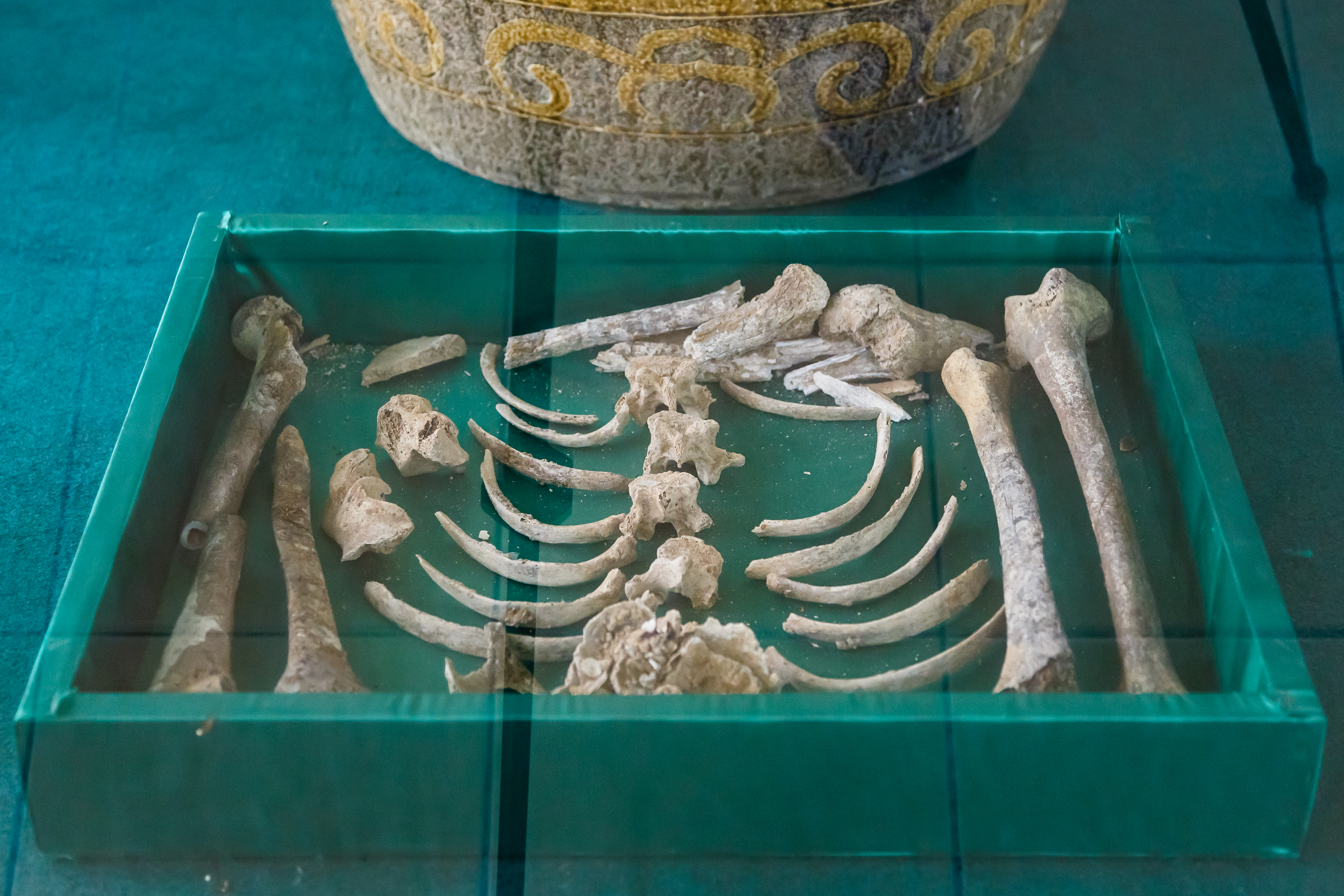
Human remains found in the jars.

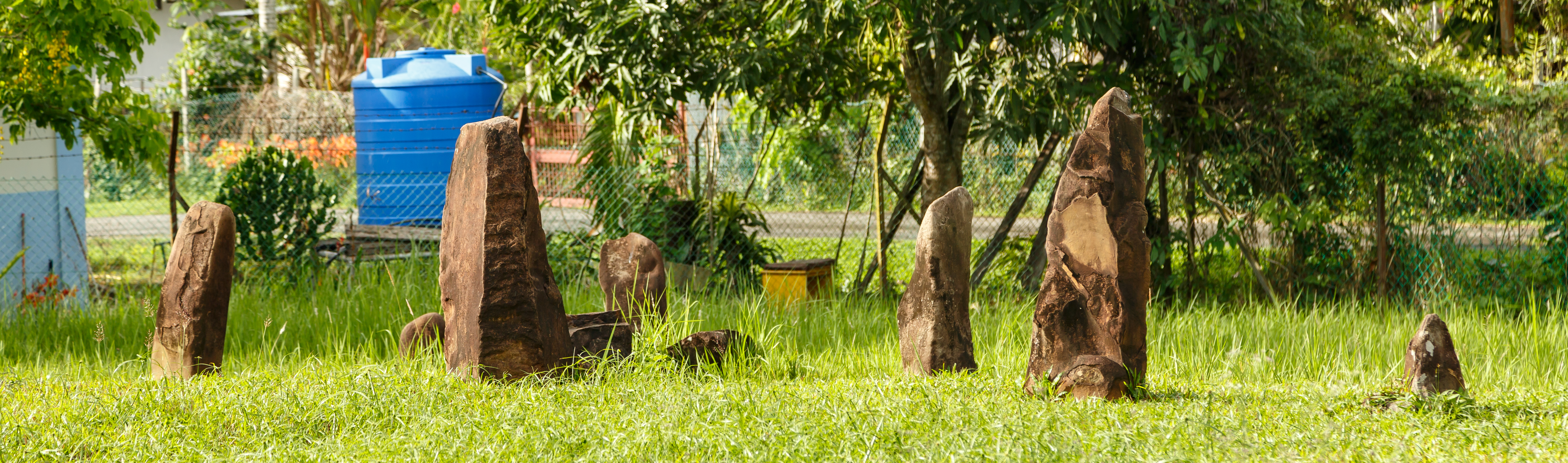
Stone megaliths in front of the museum.

== See also ==
- List of museums in Malaysia
