= Hotel Burchianti =

Historic hotel in Florence, Italy

General information
- Location: Via del Giglio 8, Florence, Italy
- Opened: 1919

Website
- hotelburchianti.it

Hotel Burchianti is a hotel in the Florence district of San Lorenzo, in the city's historic centre. The business began operating in 1919 as the Pensione Burchianti.

In 1936, under the management of the Burchianti sisters, the pensione hosted Swiss schoolgirls visiting Florence as well as other guests, including Gabriele D'Annunzio. On 1 January 2001, the business moved from Via del Giglio 6 to the adjacent Palazzo Castiglioni on Via del Giglio 8 and adopted the name Hotel Burchianti.

In 2019, La Nazione listed Hotel Burchianti among Florence's protected attività storiche, a category used for long-established local businesses whose name and activity are safeguarded.

The hotel has also been noted for ghost stories associated with it. In 2011, Reuters included Hotel Burchianti in a feature on allegedly haunted hotels, describing it as a former meeting place for artists, musicians and politicians in the early to mid-20th century and reporting claims by guests of apparitions and unexplained sensations in its "Fresco room".
