= Three Came Home =

1950 film by Jean Negulesco

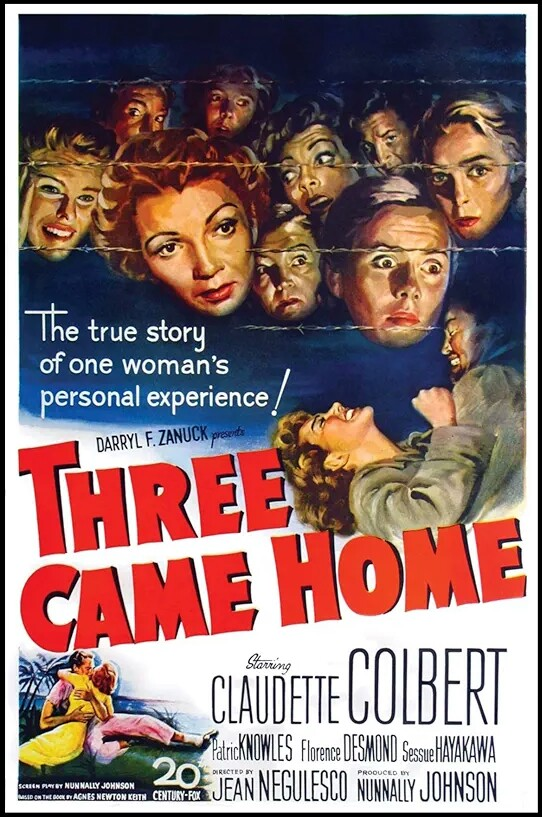
- Directed by: Jean Negulesco
- Screenplay by: Nunnally Johnson
- Based on: Three Came Home; 1947 memoir by Agnes Newton Keith
- Produced by: Nunnally Johnson
- Starring: Claudette Colbert; Patric Knowles; Florence Desmond; Sessue Hayakawa; Phyllis Morris
- Narrated by: Claudette Colbert
- Cinematography: Milton R. Krasner; William H. Daniels (uncredited)
- Edited by: Dorothy Spencer
- Music by: Hugo Friedhofer
- Distributed by: 20th Century-Fox
- Release dates: February 20, 1950 (US); March 27, 1950 (UK); May 18, 1950 (Australia)
- Running time: 106 min.
- Country: United States
- Language: English
- Box office: $1.9 million (US)

Three Came Home is a 1950 American World War II film directed by Jean Negulesco, based on the memoirs of the same name by writer Agnes Newton Keith. It depicts Keith's life in North Borneo in the period immediately before the Japanese invasion in 1942, and her subsequent internment and suffering, separated from her husband Harry, and with a young son to care for. Keith was initially interned at Berhala Island near Sandakan, North Borneo (today's Sabah) but spent most of her captivity at Batu Lintang camp at Kuching, Sarawak. The camp was liberated in September 1945.

Adapted and produced by Nunnally Johnson, the film stars Claudette Colbert. It is now in the public domain and so is available to watch in its entirety online at no charge.

== Plot ==
American-born Agnes Keith and her British husband Harry Keith live a comfortable colonial life in North Borneo with their young son George in the 1930s. Keith is the only American in Sandakan.

Borneo was strategically important to Japan as it is located on the main sea routes between Java, Sumatra, Malaya and Celebes. Control of these routes was vital to securing the territory. Japan needed an assured supply, particularly of oil, in order to achieve its long-term goal of becoming the major power in the Pacific region.

Worried about the rumours surrounding Japanese invasion in 1941, Harry suggests that Agnes move back to the United States along with George. Agnes refuses and she and George remain.

The Imperial Japanese Army invade Borneo and intern the small British community in a camp on Pulau Berhala (Berhala Island) off Sandakan. Later they are sent to the notorious Batu Lintang camp near Kuching, Sarawak, where the men and women are separated.

During the Japanese invasion of Sandakan, Agnes has a miscarriage.

These camps are under the charge of Colonel Suga. Col. Suga is fluent in English and has read a book on Borneo written by Mrs. Keith. He treats Agnes well.

When Col. Suga visits Agnes at Batu Lintang camp and asks her to autograph a copy of her book as she had agreed to back in the earlier camp, Agnes signs the book with a personal message.

The camp guards are cruel and oppressive, as seen when they shoot down a group of Australian men who try to cross the wire fencing during a bit of flirtation with the women.

One night a Japanese guard attacks Agnes in an attempted rape when she runs outside in the night to bring in the washing being blown around in the strong winds. Later she complains to Col. Suga, who asks Lieutenant Nekata to investigate. Unfortunately Agnes is not able to identify her assailant as it was too dark. Nekata insists she identify the assailant by presenting her with a written statement for her to sign. She refuses to do so as she is aware that to make an unsubstantiated accusation against any Japanese soldier is punishable by death. In an effort to get her to sign the statement while Col. Suga is away she is tortured by Nekata's junior officers (after he has left the room, to avoid being a witness to the beating) and threatened with further torture if she says anything to anyone. In great pain she tries to keep her injuries from her fellow captives. Eventually she agrees to withdraw her allegation.

In September 1945 Japan surrenders and Agnes learns from Col. Suga that his entire family was killed at the end of the war. They used to live in Tokyo but his wife was so fearful that they moved to Hiroshima where she thought they would be safer. Col. Suga sees George and two other children eating from a paint can, and he invites them into his house, where he serves them a feast of cake, ice cream and then breaks down crying.

At the end, Allied troops arrive at the camp abandoned by the Japanese and the Keith family is reunited.

== Cast ==
- Claudette Colbert as Agnes Newton Keith
- Patric Knowles as Harry Keith
- Florence Desmond as Betty Sommers
- Sessue Hayakawa as Colonel Suga
- Sylvia Andrew as Henrietta
- Mark Keuning as George Keith
- Phyllis Morris as Sister Rose
- Howard Chuman as Lieutenant Nekata
- Devi Dja as Ah Yin (uncredited)
- Jerry Fujikawa as Japanese Soldier (uncredited)
- Douglas Walton as Australian POW (uncredited)

The women prisoners were portrayed by Drue Mallory, Carol Savage, Virginia Keiley, Mimi Heyworth, Helen Westcott, and Siti Zainab.

== Production ==
In March 1949, Showmen's Trade Review reported that Negulesco's contract with 20th Century Fox had been extended for one year and that he would direct the film. Olivia de Havilland was being considered for the lead role. Nunnally Johnson wrote the screenplay and produced the film. Milton R. Krasner provided cinematography for the film. Musical score was composed by Hugo Friedhofer. Lionel Newman was the film's music director. Editing was done by Dorothy Spencer. Florence Desmond was filming in Las Vegas when the production company asked her to audition for her role. This was her first co-starring with Colbert. Alan Marshal was cast in April 1949. Kermit Whitfield made his acting debut in the role of a lieutenant commander. Shooting started on May 4, 1949, and finished on June 26. A second unit filmed locations in Borneo for four weeks. After principal photography was complete, Colbert told Negulesco "You know I'm not given to exaggeration so I hope you believe me when I say that working with you has been the most stimulating and happiest experience of my entire career." She had broken her back while shooting for one of the violent scenes. However, during the final editing process, this particular scene was removed. Another scene, showing Colbert's character conversing with a Japanese prison guard was also excised. This was the first American film in which Hayakawa spoke his native Japanese language. While filming for the concentration camp scenes, Colbert did not apply any makeup. For the scenes which involved her crossing a barbed wire, she wore leather panties for her protection. She also had to do dieting along with rest of the cast for being thinner.

20th Century Fox gave the film in a package of 8 to exhibitors, who had the right to cancel out the films not shown. Child psychologist and domestic guidance counselor Peter Blos was hired by the studio to help advertise the film. Under him, an advertisement was designed in such a manner so as to promote the "family" element in the film's story. This advertisement featured in selected publications having a circulation above 30 million. The National Legion of Decency rated the film A II. An alternate title for the film in France was Captives à Bornéo. Response to the previews were positive. Colbert did not attend the premiere due to her injury. A free screening of the film was organized by Illini Union Student Activities during the Union Movie Week in February 1953. Seven Arts Associated included the film in Volume 8 of "Films of the 50s" in 1963. After the film's release, Fox Studios listed the set for sale at US$35,000. This also included a rubber plantation.

== Box office ==
The film was popular at the British box office. According to Kinematograph Weekly it was one of the "biggest winners" at the box office in 1950 Britain.

== Critical reception ==
Upon the film's February 1950 release, Bosley Crowther said the film "bids fair to stand as one of the strongest of the year":

"Miss Colbert's performance is a beautifully modulated display of moods and passions and explosions under most inhuman and unnatural stress and strain. And Mr. Hayakawa's calculation of the Japanese colonel is a rare accomplishment. But Patric Knowles is also excellent as the British husband of Mrs. Keith from whom she is early separated, and Florence Desmond is superb as a cheerful inmate in the prison camp. Indeed, a little fellow named Mark Keuning contributes immeasurably, too, as the 4-year-old son of the author to whom she desperately clings through her ordeal. Played against realistic settings, which vividly convey the meanness of the jungle prisons, and directed by Jean Negulesco for physical and emotional credibility, Three Came Home is a comprehensive film. It will shock you, disturb you, tear your heart out. But it will fill you fully with a great respect for a heroic soul."

Three Came Home was Life magazine's "Movie of the Week" for March 20, 1950. According to Variety, "Agnes Newton Keith's deeply affecting autobiog [sic] ... has been turned from print to celluloid without any easing of the book's harrowing impact"; "Many of the scenes are tearjerkers in the better sense of the word." In August 1976, Leslie Halliwell described the film as "[w]ell-made, harrowing", assigning it 2 stars out of 4, a rarely granted high rating.

A review published in TimesDaily noted that Colbert had played an "infrequent straight dramatic [part]" and praised the production's authenticity. Harold V. Cohen of Pittsburgh Post-Gazette praised the performances given by the actors and wrote that the story "hits the head and the heart like a whiplash, and lays a chill lump in the throat." He further wrote that the film was "an absorbing saga of the blood and the sweat and the tears which were far removed from the battlefields of World War II". Kaspar Monahan of The Pittsburgh Press wrote that he had "seen no other film which deals so fairly with the Japs, depicted as individuals and not as types." He praised the film's authenticity and the cast members, especially Hayakawa and Colbert. He concluded his review by writing "It should be seen as a tribute to the gallant human spirit." Herb Miller wrote in the Sunday Herald that it was not a "pretty picture" but a "truthful one". He termed the performances fine but praised Hayakawa by writing "Hayakawa dominates every scene in which he appears. He is a characterization that will rank with the best of the season." Mitch Woodbury wrote in the Toledo Blade that the film would "tear out" the viewer's heart. He called it a "finely made", "deftly played" and "realistically directed screen drama", ignoring which "[was] impossible." Sunday Herald appreciated Colbert's "sincere and memorable performance", the film's authenticity and called it "surprising restrained". However it criticized Negulesco's direction by saying that he "[had] just missed again".

In May 1985, and timed to correspond with Colbert's return to Broadway in a revival of Aren't We All?, Howard Thompson, reviewed the film in anticipation of its "rare TV showing" on cable's USA Network. He called it "a peak in Miss Colbert's long and distinguished Hollywood career" and a "strong, compassionate film vividly evokes the horror and bleak futility of war." The film depicts "desperate women's fortitude, tenacity and love... Miss Colbert's honest, fervent portrayal – the same Miss Colbert now magnetizing Broadway in an airy, drawing-room bubble – mirrors it all." Thompson repeated his endorsement of the film a dozen years later when it was on the History Channel. Film historian Daisuke Miyao wrote in Sessue Hayakawa: Silent Cinema and Transnational Stardom that Hayakawa's role was similar to the ones he played in silent films: "a middle ground position between civilized and "Oriental menace". A review published in Movie Makers appreciated the director for "[putting] together an admirably honest drama of war, women and children.

At the 1950 Vichy Film Festival, the film won the Best Film Award and Colbert won the Best Actor Trophy. At the 1951 Freedoms Foundation Film Awards ceremony it was at the 4th place for "Outstanding achievement in bringing about a better understanding of the American way of life".

=== Accolades ===
Colbert won the Laurel Awards for Best Female Dramatic Performance.

== See also ==
- List of films in the public domain in the United States

== Bibliography ==
- Brown, John Mason (March 11, 1950). "Seeing Things". Saturday Review of Literature (1). New York: 30–31. ISSN 0147-5932.
- Dick, Bernard F. (2008). "Claudette and the "Good War"" (eBook). Claudette Colbert: She Walked in Beauty. Hollywood Legends. Jackson, Mississippi: University Press of Mississippi. ISBN 978-1-60473-329-7. OCLC 317403502.
- Graham, Virginia (February 24, 1950). "Contemporary Arts". The Spectator. 184. London: F.C. Westley: 13. OCLC 219844110.
- Halliwell, Leslie (1994). Walker, John (ed.). Halliwell's film guide (10 ed.). New York City: Harper Perennial. ISBN 9780062715890. OCLC 31690559.
- Hirschhorn, Joel (October 1, 1983). Rating the movie stars for home video, TV, cable. New York City: Beekman House. p. 88. ISBN 978-0-517-41444-6. OCLC 10238185.
- Kitamura, Hiroshi (2009). "Hollywood's 'New' Orientalism: The case of Tokyo File 212 (1951)". Historical Journal of Film, Radio and Television. 29 (4). International Association for Media and History: 505–522. doi:10.1080/01439680903363248. ISSN 0143-9685. S2CID 194052454.
- McDonald, Gerald (January 1950). "Three Came Home". Library Journal. 75. Bowker: 333. ISSN 0363-0277.
- Miyao, Daisuke (March 7, 2007). Sessue Hayakawa: Silent Cinema and Transnational Stardom (eBook). Durham, North Carolina: Duke University Press. ISBN 978-0-8223-8982-8. OCLC 658055951.
- Staggs, Sam (2013) [2001]. All About All About Eve: The Complete Behind-the-Scenes Story of the Bitchiest Film Ever Made! (eBook). New York City: St. Martin's Press. ISBN 978-1-4668-3043-1. OCLC 865105307.
- Stein, Herbert H. (January 1993). "A screen memory: My recollections and distortions of the 1950 film, Three Came Home". The Psychoanalytic Quarterly. 62 (1). New York Psychoanalytic Quarterly Press: 109–113. doi:10.1080/21674086.1993.11927370. ISSN 0033-2828. PMID 8438039.
- Tong, Luding; Bagshaw, Mark (Spring 2002). "Exploring East Asian Culture through Video Clips" (PDF). Education About Asia. 7 (1). Ann Arbor, Michigan: Association for Asian Studies, Inc: 13–21. ISSN 1090-6851.
- "Production Credits". Production Encyclopedia 1952. The Hollywood Reporter. 1952.
