= Three Came Home (book) =

1947 memoir by Agnes Newton Keith

- First edition
- Author: Agnes Newton Keith
- Illustrator: Don Johnston
- Language: English
- Genre: Memoir
- Set in: Borneo
- Published: 1947
- Publisher: Boston : Little, Brown and Co.
- Publication place: United States
- OCLC: 394895
- Preceded by: Land Below the Wind
- Followed by: White Man Returns

Three Came Home is a 1947 memoir written by Agnes Newton Keith, based on her experiences during the Japanese invasion of North Borneo. A film based on it was released in 1950 and featured Claudette Colbert in the lead role. Initially, Olivia de Havilland was chosen for the role. Originally published in the US in March 1947 by Boston publisher Little, Brown and Co. and in the UK in 1948 by London publisher Michael Joseph, it was republished by Eland in 1985, and Eland released a new edition in 2002.

== Background ==
Keith had previously written Land Below the Wind. Her husband, Harry Keith, was Conservator of Forests and Director of Agriculture in North Borneo. Their son George was born in 1940. When the Keiths were living in Borneo, it was attacked by the Imperial Japanese Army and they were interned there from January 1942 to September 1945. During her internment at the women and children's sub-camp at Kuching Internment camp along with her son George, Keith suffered from malaria and typhoid. Her husband Harry was kept in the civilian men's sub-camp.

== Summary ==
Women had to work very hard. When a Lt. General was to visit the camp, Commander Nekata orders the women to clear a strip of land where formerly rubber trees were grown and plant potato cuttings. They work the whole night and Nekata gets promoted when the Lt. General visited but the potato cuttings died very soon. At the camp, Keith is assaulted by a guard and also tortured. This results in a twisted arm and broken ribs. The Japanese are aware that she was a writer and is occasionally given a little extra food. Australian soldiers interned in a nearby camp send $50 to the women's camp through a Roman Catholic priest. Though initially they did not want to take the money, they later accepted and sent a letter of thanks to them. The condition of women is very poor and lack of sanitation and proper food made many of them sick. When Tatsuji Suga met her, he ordered her to write The Life and Thoughts of an Internee. She agreed but titled her work Captivity. She prepared notes separately for another work in minute handwriting on margins of old newspapers, reverse of labels and Chinese tobacco papers. She hid them in George's toys, pillows, sleeping mat and also in tins.

== Reception ==
W. G. Rogers called the book "sometimes shocking and often inspiring". Laura Scott Meyers wrote that the book "[was] a detailed and unvarnished account of what war was like for internees and prisoners of war". It was chosen by The Book of the Month Club as its Book of the Month for April 1947. David Judy praised Keith's humor and wrote that the book gave "a sense of what a truly successful marriage can be like even though the worst of circumstances arise." Joe Langston noted that "[Keith's] writing [was] strangely free from any hate of a particular people". Dorothy Canfield Fisher praised the book by saying "To read this book is like living through an experience rather than just reading about it". Joyce Nienstedt wrote that it was much more than a war book. Louise Parks Banes opined that "No more gallant story has ever been written than Three Came Home. According to The Gallup Independent, "[Keith's] account [was] one of the most stirring which has come out of the war".
