= The Wrath of the Gods (1914 film) =

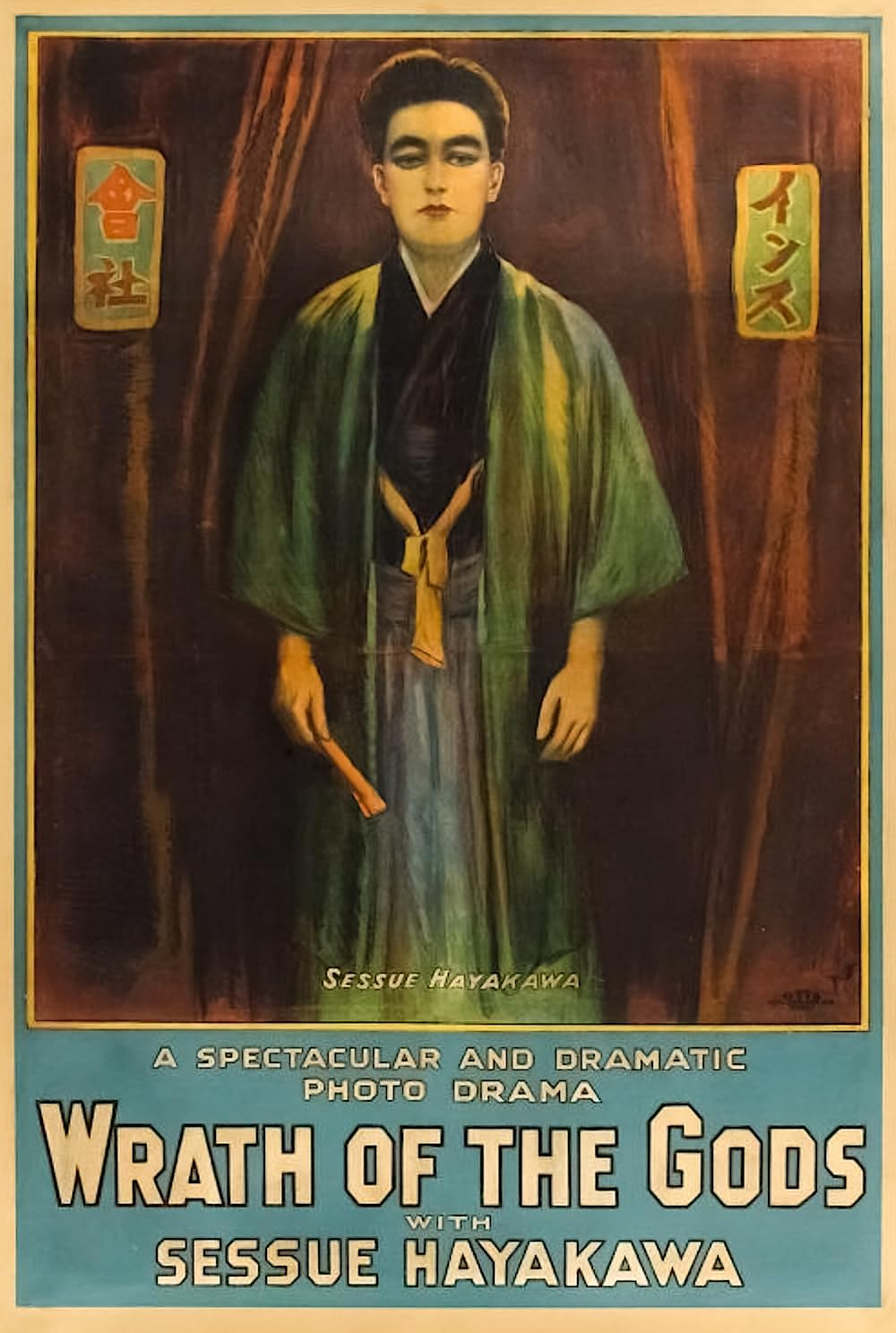
- Poster of the film
- Directed by: Reginald Barker
- Written by: William H. Clifford; Thomas H. Ince; C. Gardner Sullivan
- Screenplay by: C. Gardner Sullivan
- Produced by: Thomas H. Ince
- Starring: Sessue Hayakawa; Tsuru Aoki; Frank Borzage; Thomas Kurihara; Henry Kotani
- Production company: New York Motion Picture
- Distributed by: Mutual Film (1914) (US) (theatrical); Hiller & Wick Inc. (1917) (US) (theatrical) (re-release)
- Release date: June 7, 1914 (United States)
- Running time: 56 minutes
- Country: United States
- Language: Silent (English intertitles)

The Wrath of the Gods is a 1914 American silent drama film directed by Reginald Barker and starring Sessue Hayakawa, Tsuru Aoki, Frank Borzage, Thomas Kurihara and Henry Kotani. This was the first feature film appearance of Hayakawa and the directorial debut of Barker.

The film is based on an American sailor who comes to the Yamaki family after his ship is wrecked in the ocean. The sailor (Borzage) falls in love with the daughter (Aoki) of the family, unaware of the fact that she is cursed by God, such that if she marries, a nearby volcano will erupt and destroy the entire island on which the family lives. Writer and producer Thomas H. Ince got the idea for the film from the volcanic eruption on the island of Sakura-Jima in 1914. Hayakawa was paid $500 a week, the highest paid of any Asian stars at the time.

Filming started on January 27, 1914, and was completed on February 13. The film was released to a warm reception on June 7 after a large-scale publicity campaign. The visual effects of the film were widely appreciated by critics. It premiered in Japan on 15 September 1918, where it was later banned for "bringing dishonor to the country". Hayakawa, who played Aoki's father in the film, married her before the film's premiere.

== Plot ==
The Wrath of the Gods (1914)

Baron Yamaki is a fisherman who lives along with his daughter Toya San on an island. The island is inhabited by Buddhists and Yamaki had been cursed by Buddha for an affront by one of his ancestors who, in a murderous rage, defiled an altar of Buddha in the nearby temple. The curse was that if his daughter married anyone, then the nearby volcano would erupt. Toya finds it difficult to form relationships with boys because the village prophet Takeo has spread the rumour that she is cursed. She is therefore unwilling to continue her father's acceptance of the curse. When Yamaki takes Toya-san to the Buddha shrine in the garden of his house to pray and try to get the curse removed, she vents her feelings about the god's unfairness.

An American sailor, Tom Wilson, whose ship has been wrecked in a storm, comes to them for help and shelter. Wilson falls in love with Toya and teaches her about Christianity. To the consternation of her father, Toya decides to convert and marry Tom at the local Japanese-American mission. However, her father also converts. The locals, who have been stirred up by Takeo, go on a murderous rampage against the family. They first go to the chapel but the newlyweds evade them and so they go to the beach house instead. When the mob reaches his house, Yamaki throws out the Buddha statue he had set up in his house and puts a cross in its place. The villagers are infuriated by this; they beat him to death beneath the cross and burn his house. Eventually, the volcano erupts and the village is destroyed, and Takeo dies in an avalanche. Only Tom Wilson and Toya San survive. They are taken away from the destroyed village by a United States merchant vessel. At the end of the film, Tom tells his bride, "Your gods may be powerful, Toya San, but mine has proved his omnipotence. You are saved to perpetuate your race."

== Cast ==
- Sessue Hayakawa as Lord Yamaki
- Tsuru Aoki as Toya San
- Frank Borzage as Tom Wilson
- Thomas Kurihara as Takeo
- Henry Kotani as Mr. Hoshida

== Production ==
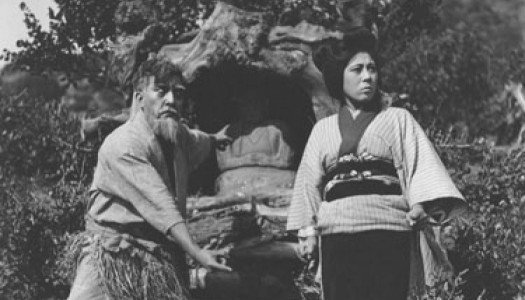
Sessue Hayakawa and Tsuru Aoki in The Wrath of the Gods

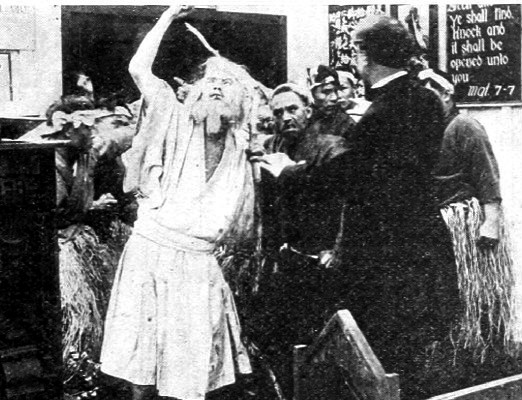
The prophet at the Christian church

On 12 January 1914, a volcano erupted on the island of Sakura-Jima in Kagoshima prefecture, in the southern part of Japan. It was one of the biggest disasters in the history of Japan. Producer Thomas H. Ince immediately decided to make a film based on the incident. The Toledo Blade reported on 24 January 1914 that "News of the eruption was hardly a day old before Mr. Ince had built in Santa Monica canyon a whole Japanese village". Ince had constructed a very large village in his studio Inceville in Culver City, California, and decided, where possible, to use Japanese people instead of Americans as extras. He gathered workers from the Southern California who were to work as peasants in the film. Approximately 1,000, mostly Japanese, extras were used. The film's shooting began on 27 January 1914, just 15 days after the eruption ceased. Actress Enid Markey was "badly injured" during the production; during her scene in which the lava flow destroys the village she was surrounded by smoke and fumes and nearly asphyxiated, but had recovered by May 1914. Six reels were used to film it in total.

To help publicize the production, Ince reported to the newspapers that lead-actress Tsuru Aoki was a native of the island of Sakura and she had lost all her relatives in the eruption—she was actually from Obara Tsuru city, Kyushu, 180 miles north of Sakura-Jima. Ince also embroidered her biography so that she would appeal to the middle-class audiences as the heroine of a melodrama, claiming that she was the daughter of an illustrious Japanese artist. The biographical-type publicity added emotional and psychological authenticity to the character that Aoki played in the film.

Sessue Hayakawa, Aoki's soon-to-be husband, played her father in the film; they married on May 1 just before the film's release. Hayakawa was paid $500 a week and, seeing another chance to publicize his production, Ince stated that Hayakawa was "the highest paid of all oriental stars." The film's shipwreck scene was shot off the coast of Santa Monica, and an erupting volcano was also included among its lavish effects. This was the first feature film appearance of Hayakawa and the directorial debut of Barker.

== Publicity and release ==
Targeted at the middle class, a large-scale publicity campaign was organized by the New York Motion Picture Corporation. Four months prior to the release, New York Motion Picture Corporation put an advertisement in the 14 February 1914 edition of the New York Clipper, announcing: "Wait for The Wrath of the Gods." Major journals carried full-page advertisements of the film every week with pictures, various ad lines and photographs taken on the film set. An advertisement of the film featured an angry looking statue of Buddha and a young woman in a kimono praying in front of it. The marriage of the lead actors Tsuru Aoki and Sessue Hayakawa was also included in the publicity campaign. The film was released in a new theater called The Strand, on 7 June 1914.

Variety noted that "special and incidental music was written by Joseph Littau, pianist of the orchestra there. The stage [at the Strand] was given a Japanesy air and atmosphere by the management." The Wrath of the Gods was purported to have attracted 21,000 spectators when Marcus Loew screened it along with a vaudeville bill at the opening of his summertime evening entertainment at Ebbets Field in Brooklyn.

== Reception ==
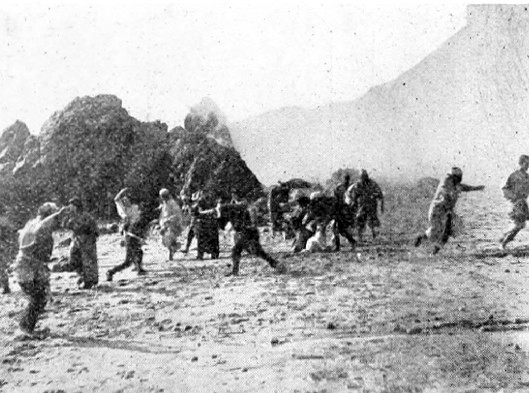
Fleeing villagers from the erupting volcano

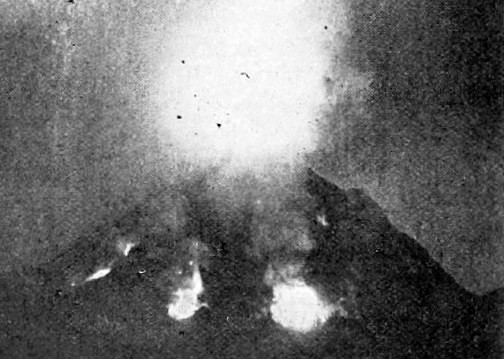
The erupting volcano, the effects of which were highly praised by critics

The film was well received by critics, particularly for its visual effects, especially the volcano eruption scene. An advertisement for the film in the Williamsport Sun-Gazette stated "Nothing like the "Wrath of God" has ever been seen. Pandemonium. Thrilling. Superb." The Reading Times called the film a "genuine masterpiece", stating that it contained "the greatest volcano scenes ever filmed" at the time. The New York Critics also hailed the film as a masterpiece, and the Brooklyn Daily Eagle considered it to be the best film of 1914. The Washington Post wrote that the "scenic effects obtained are especially picturesque, a volcano in full action becoming the central sensation". The Chicago Daily Tribune called the film "impressive", and spoke of the "scenic splendor" and the "vigorous beauty of the outdoor settings". True Republican wrote that "In the motion picture field [the film] was greater than The Darling of the Gods in drama, or Madame Butterfly in opera." It also wrote that the volcanic eruption and typhoon scenes "can never be obliterated from the mind."

The film was praised for its happy ending even though the Aoki's character lost her village. Critic Gina Marchetti proposed in her book Tragic and Transcendent Love in the Forbidden City that the film was "simultaneously warning against miscegenation while celebrating romantic love." The lead actress Tsuru Aoki's acting was also highly appreciated for adding "the sense of naturalness to the archetypal narrative between Japan and the United States." However, in Japan the lead actors Hayakawa and Aoki were considered insults to the country. The Japanese film critics labeled the film "Anti-Japanese" for portraying the country and its people in a primitive manner. The film premiered in Asakusa's Fujikan Theater on September 15, 1918, but was banned a few weeks later for bringing "dishonour to the country".

The father Yamaki sacrifices himself in order to cut all ties between her daughter and Japan hoping that she would be protected by Tom and his Christian God. While referring to the film in particular, the film theorist Kaeriyama Norimasa said "Isn't it a huge loss that Japanese producers don't make any film for export and have all the greatly unique landscape of Japan by foreigners?" Daisuke Miyao, in The Oxford Handbook of Japanese Cinema, states that the film and its narrative of a religion collision "emphasize the difficulty for a Japanese woman to become submissive to Christianity and the American family system", stating that the film is first and foremost "an archetypal fable pitting the civilized West, embodied by an American sailor, against the primitive East, embodied by the Japanese woman, told as a religious battle between Buddhism and Christianity".

The film was screened along with The Dragon Painter, which also stars Sessue Hayakawa, at the 30th Los Angeles Asian Pacific Film Festival on May 4, 2014. The film's DVD was released in the United States on 18 March 2008.

== See also ==
- Tsuru Aoki
- Sessue Hayakawa
- List of American films of 1914

== Bibliography ==
- Bowser, Eileen (1990). The Transformation of Cinema, 1907–1915, Volume 2, Part 2. University of California Press. ISBN 978-0-520-08534-3.
- Bertellini, Giorgio (2010). Italy in Early American Cinema: Race, Landscape, and the Picturesque. Indiana University Press. ISBN 978-0-253-22128-5.
- Fairservice, Don (2001). Film Editing: History, Theory and Practice: Looking at the Invisible. Manchester University Press. ISBN 978-0-7190-5777-9.
- Hershfield, Joanne (2000). The Invention of Dolores Del Rio. University of Minnesota Press. ISBN 978-0-8166-3410-1.
- Marchetti, Gina (1993). Romance and the "yellow Peril": Race, Sex, and Discursive Strategies in Hollywood Fiction. University of California Press. ISBN 978-0-520-91462-9.
- Miyao, Daisuke (2007). Sessue Hayakawa: Silent Cinema and Transnational Stardom. Duke University Press. ISBN 978-0-8223-8982-8.
- Miyao, Daisuke (December 2013). The Oxford Handbook of Japanese Cinema. Oxford University Press. ISBN 978-0-19-973166-4.
- Sharp, Jasper (2011). Historical Dictionary of Japanese Cinema. Scarecrow Press. ISBN 978-0-8108-7541-8.
