= Sessue Hayakawa: Silent Cinema and Transnational Stardom =

- Book's cover
- Author: Daisuke Miyao
- Language: English
- Subject: Sessue Hayakawa
- Published: March 7, 2007 by Duke University Press
- Publication place: United States
- Pages: 379
- Awards: Book Award in History, Association of Asian American Studies (2007); John Hope Franklin Book Award from Duke University (2007)
- ISBN: 978-0-8223-3969-4
- OCLC: 470908395

Sessue Hayakawa: Silent Cinema and Transnational Stardom is a biography of actor Sessue Hayakawa, written by Daisuke Miyao, assistant professor of film at the University of Oregon, and published by Duke University Press. It won the 2007 Book Award in History from the Association of Asian American Studies and the John Hope Franklin Book Award from Duke University (2007).

== Background ==
Daisuke Miyao graduated from the University of Tokyo before receiving a doctorate in New York University's Department of Cinema Studies. Sessue Hayakawa (1889–1973) won an Academy Award for Best Supporting Actor nomination for his role in the 1957 film The Bridge on the River Kwai. However, in the majority of his film appearances he played the role of a villain. Japanese immigrants to the United States felt that such stereotypes had a negative impact on how the Japanese community was viewed in America. For his research, Miyao cited Japanese immigrant newspapers, clipping files, scrapbooks, Japanese published works, journals, film magazines, and so on. Hayakawa has been called the "only non-Caucasian star of the American cinema from the mid-teens to the 1920s". This book is the first major study on Hayakawa's film career.

== Summary ==
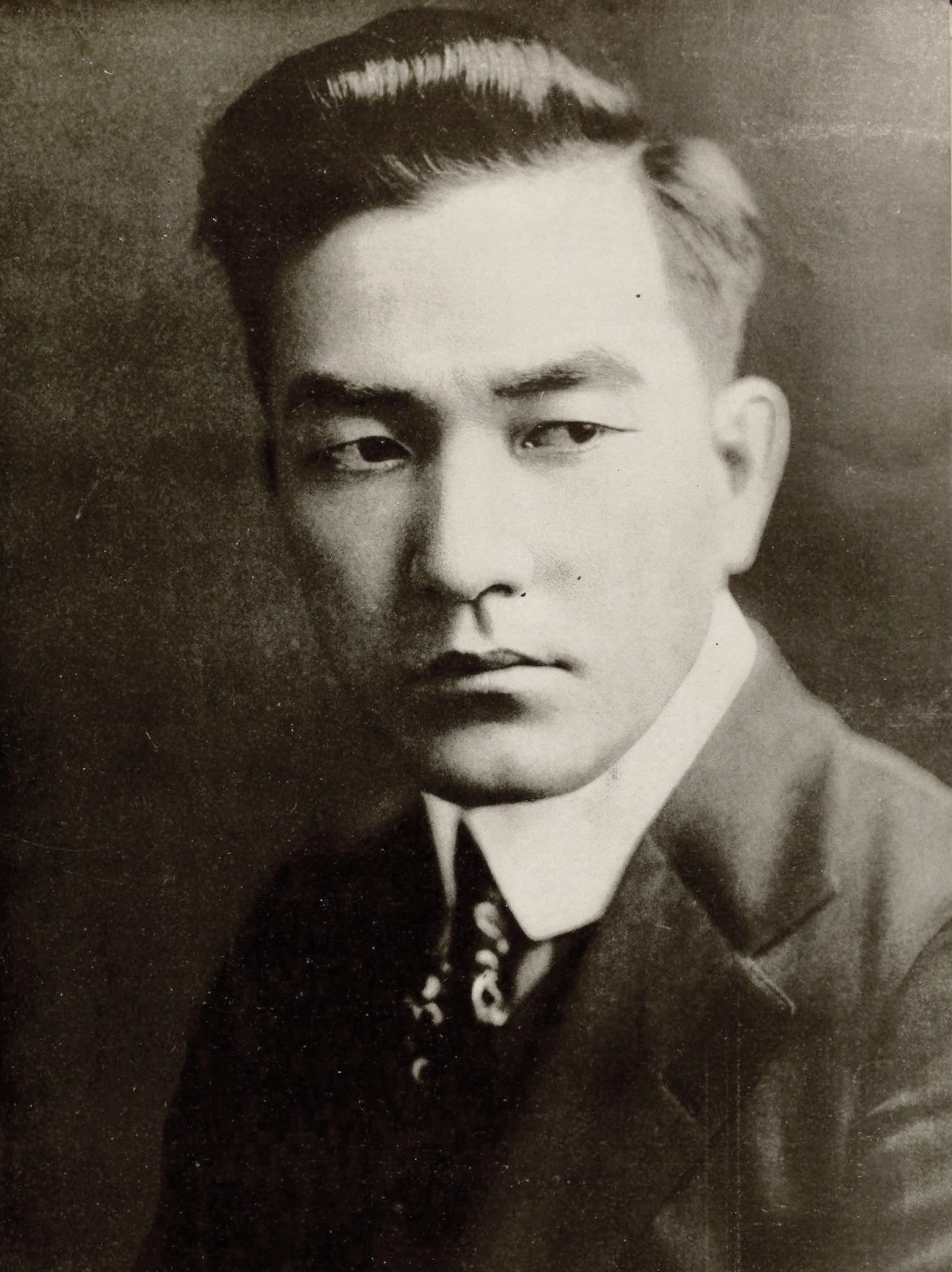
Sessue Hayakawa in 1918

The book is divided in 15 chapters and gives details about Hayakawa's early life, career, popularity, and decline, while focusing on his career during the mid- and late-1910s and Japanese-American relations during the same period. It discusses racial politics that limited the roles the actor was offered, mostly of villains. Knowing that people of different communities, Japanese, Japanese-American and European-American, had different ideas about "authentic" Japanese characters, Hayakawa sought more independence in his choice of roles and started the Haworth Picture Corporation in 1918. Changes in the depiction of Japanese people in films are also discussed in the book. During World War I, Japan, then an ally of the United States was portrayed positively and the country's scenic beauty was also featured. After the war, Japanese control of the Pacific region led to a clash with American interests and, consequently, the depiction of the Japanese in American films changed.

The book is in four parts. The first part deals with Hayakawa's early career and rise to stardom (1914–15), with detailed information about the themes explored in his early films like The Wrath of the Gods (dealing with Buddhism) and The Cheat (masculinity, violence). The latter film brought him international fame. He married fellow actress Tsuru Aoki in 1914. The second and third parts discuss his films during 1916–18 and 1918–22, respectively, while the final part gives an account of his public image in both America and Japan. When Hayakawa started Haworth Picture Corporation, Japanese residents in America viewed it as a symbol of his success and entrepreneurship. However, his Americanization was viewed as a national shame in Japan. Americans, meanwhile, thought of him as a role model for Japanese settled in United States and an Americanized and refined Japanese. He left Hollywood in the late 1920s and moved to Europe, where he acted in English and French movies, before returning to Japan where he became a priest. Hayakawa's filmography is also provided in the book, with details about the characters he portrayed. The final chapter gives a detailed account of Hayakawa's role in The Bridge on the River Kwai and discusses the similarities between this role and the role played by Hayakawa in The Cheat. His stage works are also discussed in this chapter.

== Reception ==
In his review published in the Early Popular Visual Culture, cinema historian Stephen Bottomore called it a significant book and appreciated the "Japanisme touches" given to its design by the publisher. He wrote that the book was "extremely well researched" and would be a very useful resource for students of Japanese-American issues. He stated that the book "[did] much to rehabilitate [the] important transnational star [Hayakawa]." Sachiko Mizuno wrote in The Journal of Asian Studies that Miyao had "dynamically [mobilized] rich English and Japanese primary sources". She called the book an "unparalleled contribution" and "an exemplary model for bridging the fields of cinema studies, Asian American studies, and Japanese studies". Matthew Mizenko wrote in Pacific Affairs, "Accessibly written and replete with impeccable scholarship and incisive analysis, Miyao's book constitutes a major contribution to film studies, Asian-American studies and cultural studies." Freda Freiberg wrote in the journal Asian Studies Review, "This book is a welcome addition to the literature on Orientalism, romance and the Yellow Peril in the Hollywood Cinema" and appreciated Miyao's bilingualism, assiduous research, and wide-ranging scholarship.

In his review for the journal Intersections: Gender and Sexuality in Asia and the Pacific, Yves Laberge opined that the book was not an art book and claimed that it gave a "partial account of [Hayakawa]'s career"; he also claimed that Miyao might have adapted it from his Ph.D. thesis. However, Laberge wrote that the book would be useful for undergraduates in Asian American studies, Japanese studies, cultural studies, and film history, and also in gender studies and cross-cultural studies. Additionally, he felt that the book was short. Duke magazine's Edward M. Gomez criticized what he perceived to be the repetitious nature of the book and said that it "[read] like a laundry list of plot summaries." He further opined that "although it fails to provide a three-dimensional portrait of its subject, it does accomplish its goal of showing how producers and Hayakawa carefully managed the tense balance between Americanization and Japaneseness."
