= Tatsuji Suga =

Japanese army officer & war criminal (1885-1945)

- 菅 辰次
- Born: September 22, 1885; Hiroshima, Japan
- Died: September 16, 1945 (aged 59); Borneo
- Military career
- Allegiance: Empire of Japan
- Branch: Imperial Japanese Army
- Service years: ?–1945
- Rank: Lieutenant Colonel
- Commands: Prison Camps
- Conflicts: World War I; Second Sino-Japanese War; World War II; Pacific War

Lieutenant-Colonel Tatsuji Suga (菅 辰次, Suga Tatsuji; 22 September 1885 – 16 September 1945) of the Imperial Japanese Army was the commander of all prisoner-of-war (POW) and civilian internment camps in Borneo, during World War II. Suga died by suicide five days after being taken prisoner by Australian forces in September 1945.

== Early life ==
Suga was born in Hiroshima, the first son in his family. Although the family held Buddhist beliefs, his younger brother Giichi converted to Christianity and became a Protestant missionary: he worked at churches in Manchuria, Vancouver Island, and Chicago and became the headmaster of YMCA in Tokyo. As a youngster, Suga attended the services at the Alliance Church of Hiroshima which was started by a Danish priest. Hudson Southwell, an Australian missionary interned in Borneo, later wrote: "During our time in the internment camp, Colonel Suga had often come into the church services in the women's section and sat near the back. Once he told Winsome [Southwell's wife] directly, 'I'm a Christian.' This was a startling admission for a Japanese officer to make to a prisoner during wartime."

Suga graduated from Meido Middle School in Hiroshima and then the Imperial Japanese Army Academy in Tokyo, as a Second Lieutenant. At around this time he married a woman with the given name Teru; they were to have two sons and four daughters. Suga was an affectionate father and ensured that all of his children went to university, at a time when only five per cent of Japanese went beyond the fifth or sixth grade. He was an expert horseman and a keen practitioner of kendo.

Toward the end of World War I (during which Japan was an Allied power), Suga served in Siberia, Korea, Manchuria and China. In 1924, he took early retirement as a Major, and decided to pursue a career teaching English. He sailed to the United States, leaving his family in Japan, supported by his pension.

Suga in 1924

Suga studied to become a certified teacher of English as a second language, at the University of Washington in Seattle. He supported himself by taking a series of jobs, such as dish-washing, and by fishing. He was interviewed in Seattle in 1924 by William Carlson Smith as part of Smith's research on race relations, later used for his book Americans in the Making, which was published in 1939.

Suga taught English as a lecturer at the Hiroshima High School of Technology (now the Department of Technology, Hiroshima University), Japan, before he was called back to active service in 1937, to serve in the Second Sino-Japanese War. He became ill with diabetes and retired again in October 1941. After the Japanese attack on Pearl Harbor, Suga volunteered for service as a prison camp commander on an advice of his younger brother, believing that his language skills would prove useful. He was appointed commander of all POW and internment camps in Borneo.

== Borneo ==
On Borneo there were Japanese-run internment camps at Batu Lintang, Kuching, Sarawak, Jesselton (later Kota Kinabalu), Sandakan and briefly on Labuan island. Suga was based at Batu Lintang but was often absent on business at the other camps.

Suga is described in Three Came Home, an account by Agnes Newton Keith, a female civilian internee at Batu Lintang:

A little Japanese man, onetime graduate of the University of Washington, patron of the arts, recipient of World War I Allied decorations; a military man with shaven head; a sick man with diabetes who eats no sugar; a soldier who likes children; a little man with a big sword; a religious dilettante, born Shintoist and turning Catholic; a hero and a figure of ridicule; a Japanese patriot, Commander of All Prisoners of War and Internees in Borneo.

Rosemary Beatty, an Australian who was a small child when she was interned at Batu Lintang, recalled Suga's acts of kindness to her and other children:

I suppose the thing that really sticks in my mind really is Colonel Suga coming through the gates in his car and we would sneak into it and hide, and then he would drive off and find we were there. He'd take us up to his residence and serve us coffee[,] fruit and show us magazines... He'd even give us lollies to bring back to camp.

Brutality by the guards at Batu Lintang increased when Suga was away; internees wondered whether he left instructions for this to happen or whether the juniors left in charge took advantage of his absence to further abuse the prisoners.

The atomic bombings in Japan at Hiroshima on 6 August 1945, followed by that of Nagasaki on 9 August, precipitated the abrupt end of the war. On 15 August 1945, Japan announced its official unconditional surrender to the Allied Powers. On 24 August, Suga officially announced to the prisoners at Batu Lintang that Japan had surrendered. Suga was a broken man: he believed that his entire family had been killed in the bombing of Hiroshima. In fact, his wife and three of his children survived the bombing though his sister Teru and brother-in-law Tamekichi Tanaka as well as his son Makoto were killed.

Suga attended the official surrender of the Japanese forces in the Kuching area by their commander, Major-General Hiyoe Yamamura, on board HMAS Kapunda on 11 September 1945. Later that day Suga officially surrendered to Brigadier Thomas Eastick, commander of Kuching Force — a detachment from the Australian 9th Division — at Batu Lintang camp.

The body of Suga after his suicide

The following day Suga, together with several of his officers were flown to the Australian base on Labuan, to await their trials as war criminals. Suga died by suicide there on 16 September. Other officers were later tried, found guilty and executed. Southwell wrote:

Now, with the end of the war, he awaited a military tribunal. His country had been destroyed; his army defeated; his family lost. And, apart from the despair in his heart, the bushido tradition, the code of the Japanese warrior, had deep roots. The fateful day came on September 16th, one week before his 60th birthday, traditionally a time when a family would gather round in celebration. Colonel Tatsuji Suga believed he had no-one to gather around; and he had no desire to see that day alone.

== Evaluation ==
As Commander of all POW and civilian internee camps, Suga was legally responsible for the many atrocities that took place in these camps, including the Sandakan Death Marches.

As the war closed, Suga was given multiple orders to execute all prisoners within the camp, orders which he failed to carry out.

Although Keith admired some of his personal qualities and felt that he had saved the life of her husband, who was also interned in the camp, she also recorded: "Against this, I place the fact that all prisoners in Borneo were inexorably moving towards starvation. Prisoners of war and civilians were beaten, abused and tortured. Daily living conditions of prison camps were almost unbearable." Keith added:

At Sandakan and Ranau and Brunei, North Borneo, batches of prisoners in fifties and sixties were marched out to dig their own graves, then shot or bayoneted and pushed into the graves, many before they were dead. All over Borneo hundreds and thousands of sick, weak, weary prisoners were marched on roads and paths until they fell from exhaustion, when their heads were beaten in with rifle butts and shovels, and split open with swords, and they were left to rot unburied. On one march 2,790 POWs started, and three survived ... For these black chapters in captivity Colonel Suga, commander in Borneo, must be held responsible.

Another internee at Batu Lintang, Australian civil servant Ivan Quartermaine, said that by the time the 9th Division liberated the camp, the health of the prisoners was so poor they believed they had only "three months to live, the whole camp. We were in pretty bad shape." After liberation, he and other prisoners sought weapons from Australian soldiers, to take revenge on Japanese personnel, but were refused. On reflection, Quartermaine said, he believed that Suga was powerless in regard to the actions of the Japanese secret police, the Kempeitai.

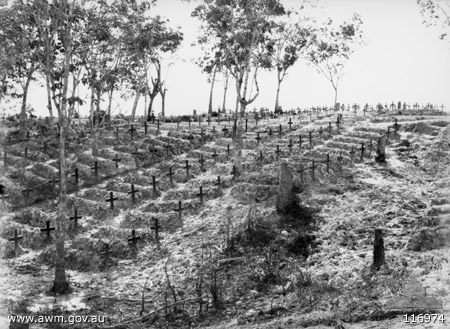
A section of the cemetery at Batu Lintang camp.

After liberation the bodies were exhumed from the cemetery and sent to Labuan for reburial in a central military cemetery there. A large number of the graves of prisoners from Batu Lintang now at Labuan are unidentified: after the Japanese surrender Suga destroyed many camp records. The cemetery in Labuan is cared for by the Commonwealth War Graves Commission.

In the 1950 film adaptation of Keith's book, Suga was played by Sessue Hayakawa.
