= Ernest Fenollosa =

American art historian and orientalist (1853–1908)

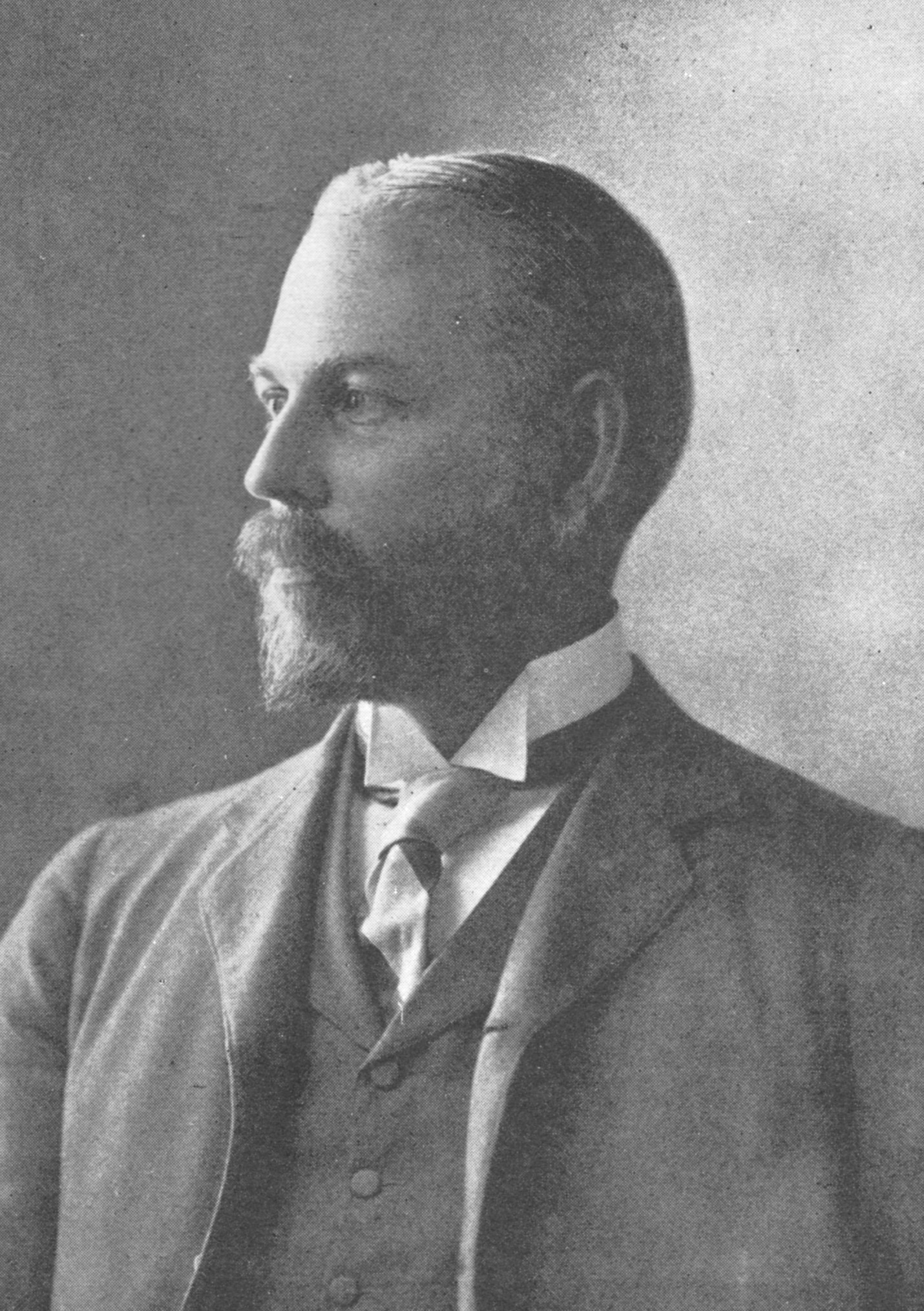
- Fenollosa in 1890
- Born: Ernest Francisco Fenollosa; February 18, 1853; Salem, Massachusetts
- Died: September 21, 1908 (aged 55); London, England
- Resting place: Mii-dera
- Occupations: Art historian; professor
- Years active: 1878-1908
- Employer(s): Tokyo Imperial Museum; Museum of Fine Arts, Boston; Tokyo Higher Normal School
- Spouse(s): Elizabeth Goodhue Millett (1878-1895); Mary McNeill Scott (1895-1908)

Ernest Francisco Fenollosa (February 18, 1853 – September 21, 1908) was an American art historian of Japanese art, professor of philosophy and political economy at Tokyo Imperial University. An important educator during the modernization of Japan during the Meiji Era, Fenollosa was an enthusiastic Orientalist who did much to preserve traditional Japanese art.

== Biography ==
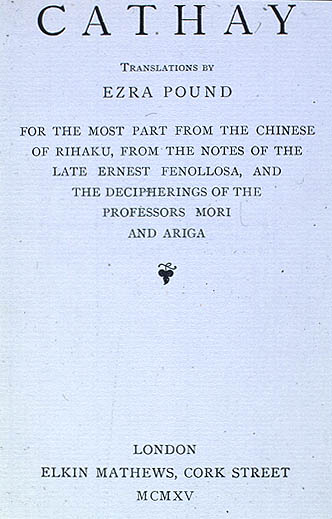
Title page of Cathay, poems by Ezra Pound, 1915, based on translations by Fenollosa.

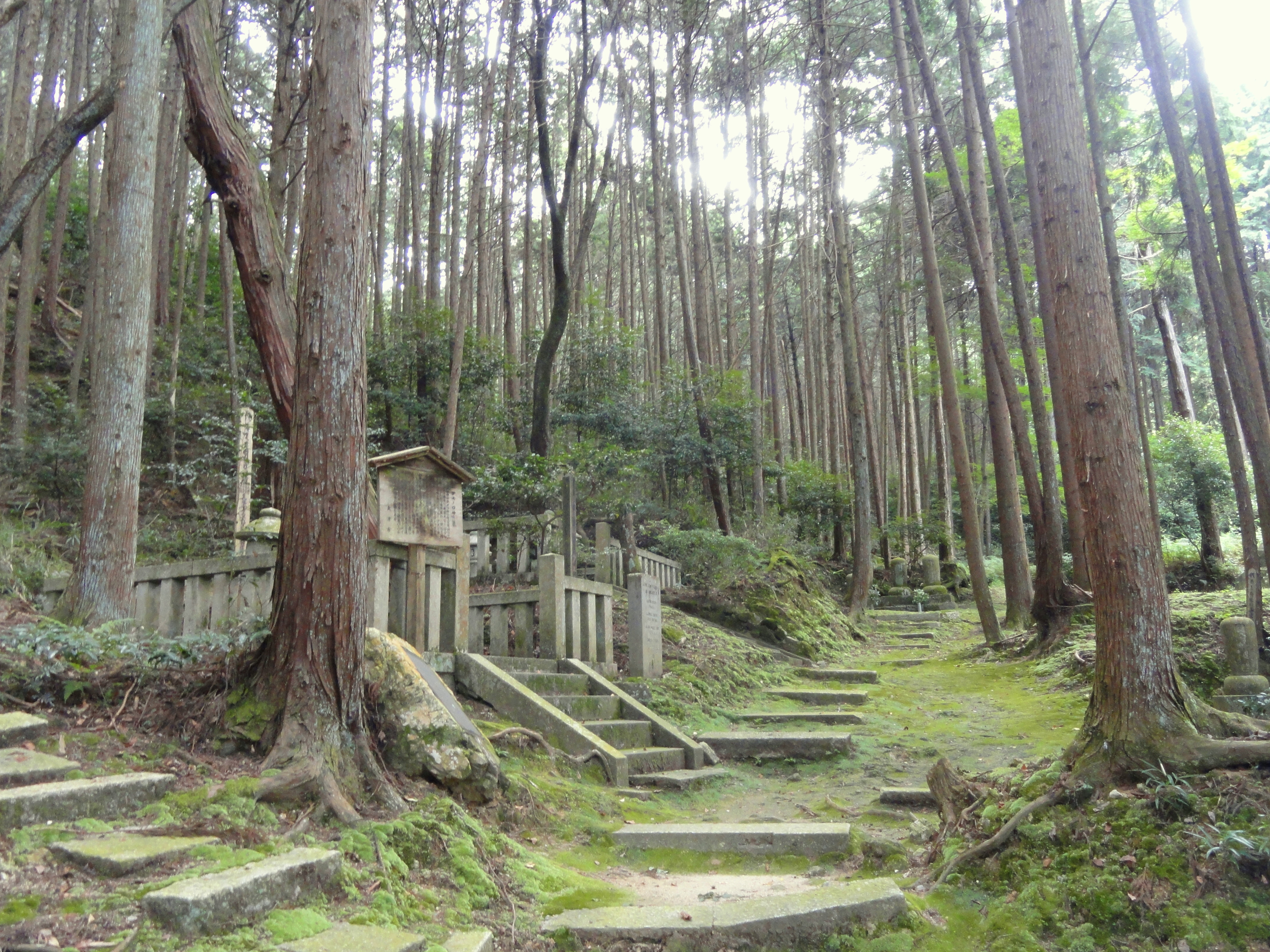
Fenollosa's grave, Hōmyō-in chapel of Mii-dera, Otsu

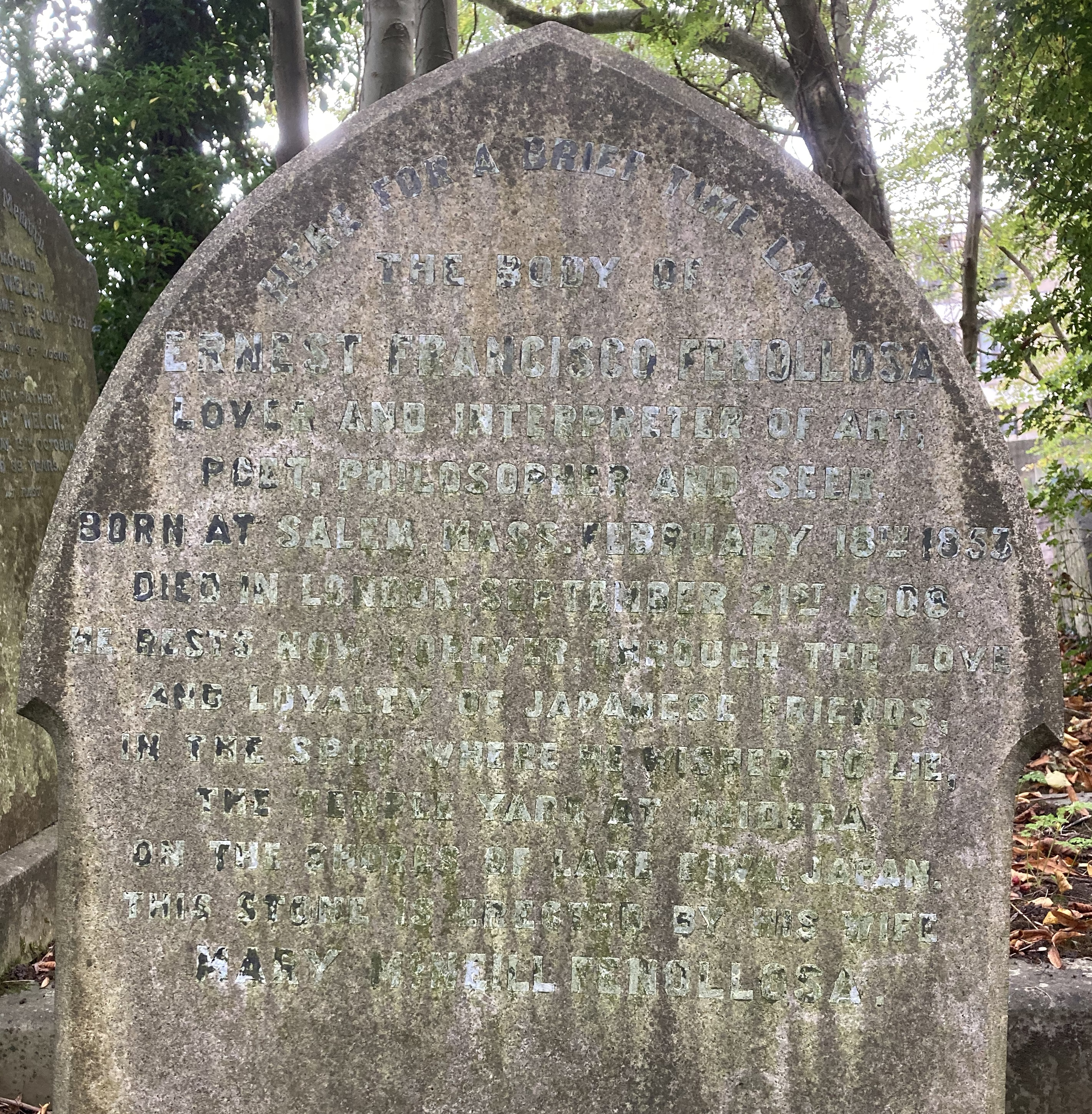
Memorial to Ernest Fenollosa in Highgate Cemetery, London

Fenollosa was born in 1853 as the son of Manuel Francisco Ciriaco Fenollosa, a Spanish pianist born in Málaga in 1818, and Mary Silsbee, a member of a prominent family in Boston. He attended public schools in his hometown of Salem, Massachusetts before studying philosophy and sociology at Harvard College, where he graduated in 1874.

He studied for a year at the art school of the Boston Museum of Fine Arts, during which time he married Elizabeth Goodhue Millett (1853–1920). In 1878 he was invited to Japan by American zoologist and Orientalist Edward S. Morse. Fenollosa taught political economy and philosophy at the Imperial University at Tokyo. There he also studied ancient temples, shrines and art treasures with his assistant, Okakura Kakuzō.

During his time in Japan, Fenollosa helped create the nihonga (Japanese) style of painting with Japanese artists Kanō Hōgai (1828–1888) and Hashimoto Gahō (1835–1908). In May 1882 he delivered a lecture on "An Explanation of the Truth of Art", which was widely circulated and quoted.

One of his students was the creator of judo, Kanō Jigorō.

After eight years at the university, Fenollosa helped found the Tokyo School of Fine Arts and the Tokyo Imperial Museum. He served as director of the latter in 1888. In this period, he helped to draft the text of a law for the preservation of temples and shrines and their art treasures.

Deeply influenced by living in Japan, Fenollosa converted to Buddhism; he was given the name Teishin. He was also granted the name Kano Eitan Masanobu, placing him in the lineage of the Kanō school, who had served as painters to the Tokugawa shoguns. While resident in Japan, Fenollosa conducted the first inventory of Japan's national treasures. This resulted in the discovery of ancient Chinese scrolls, which had been brought to Japan by traveling monks centuries earlier. He was able to rescue many Buddhist artifacts that would otherwise have been destroyed under the haibutsu kishaku movement. For these achievements, the Emperor Meiji of Japan decorated Fenollosa with the Order of the Rising Sun and the Order of the Sacred Treasures.

Fenollosa amassed a large personal collection of Japanese art during his stay in Japan. In 1886, he sold his art collection to Boston physician Charles Goddard Weld (1857–1911) on the condition that it go to the Museum of Fine Arts in Boston. In 1890 he returned to Boston to serve as curator of the department of Oriental Art. There Fenollosa was asked to choose Japanese art for display at the 1893 World Columbian Exposition in Chicago. He also organized Boston's first exhibition of Chinese painting in 1894. In 1896, he published Masters of Ukiyoe, a historical account of Japanese paintings and ukiyo-e prints exhibited at the New York Fine Arts Building.

When he divorced his wife, his immediate remarriage in 1895 to writer Mary McNeill Scott (1865–1954) outraged Boston society. Fenollosa was dismissed from the Museum in 1896.

He returned to Japan in 1897 to accept a position as Professor of English Literature at the Tokyo Higher Normal School at Tokyo. Lafcadio Hearn considered Fenollosa a friend; and Hearn almost believed that he visited the professor's home too often.

In 1900, Fenollosa returned to the United States to write and lecture on Asia. He died of a heart attack during a visit to London in 1908. His body was briefly interred on the eastern side of Highgate Cemetery, in London, but later cremated. According to his wishes, his ashes were returned for burial to the Hōmyō-in chapel of Mii-dera (where he had been tonsured), high above Lake Biwa. His tombstone was paid for by the Tokyo School of Fine Arts.

Fenollosa's widow entrusted his unpublished notes on Chinese poetry and Japanese Noh drama to noted American poet Ezra Pound. Together with William Butler Yeats, Pound used the notes to stimulate the growing interest in Far Eastern literature among modernist writers. Pound subsequently finished Fenollosa's work with the aid of Arthur Waley, the noted British sinologist. Concentrating on Japanese art before 1800, it was published in two volumes in 1912. Fenollosa offered Hokusai's prints as a window of beauty after Japanese art had become too modern for his own taste: "Hokusai is a great designer, as Kipling and Whitman are great poets. He has been called the Dickens of Japan."

Arthur Wesley Dow said of Fenollosa that "he was gifted with a brilliant mind of great analytical power, this with a rare appreciation gave him an insight into the nature of fine art such as few ever attain."

== Criticism ==
At a Harvard lecture of 2011, Benjamin Elman refers to the Epochs of the Chinese and Japanese Art (1912) where Fenollosa compares "degeneration" of the late imperial Chinese art to that which befell the high antique art of Europe in Byzantium ("the poorest of the Byzantine mosaics"; "the only hope for the hopeless is to perceive itself to be hopeless"). According to Elman, Fenollosa's perception was influenced by the political and military defeats of the Qing empire.

== See also ==
- Modernist poetry in English
- American philosophy
- List of American philosophers
- Imagism

== Bibliography ==
- East and West, The Discovery of American and Other Poems, New York: Thomas Y. Crowell & Co., 1983.
- The Masters of Ukioye: a Complete Historical Description of Japanese Paintings and Color Prints of the Genre School, New York: The Knickerbocker Press, 1896.
- Epochs of Chinese and Japanese Art, London: William Heinemann, 1912.
- Certain Noble Plays of Japan from the manuscripts of Ernest Fenollosa, edited by Ezra Pound with introduction by William Butler Yeats, The Cuala Press, 1916.
- "Noh" or Accomplishment: A Study of the Classical Stage of Japan, with Ezra Pound, London: Macmillan and Co., 1916. Rpt. The Classic Noh Theatre of Japan, New York: New Directions, 1959.
- The Chinese Written Character as a Medium for Poetry, edited by Ezra Pound after the author's death, 1918.
- The Chinese Written Character as a Medium for Poetry: A Critical Edition, edited Haun Saussy, Jonathan Stalling & Lucas Klein, Fordham University Press, 2008.
