= Harry Keith =

British forester and plant collector

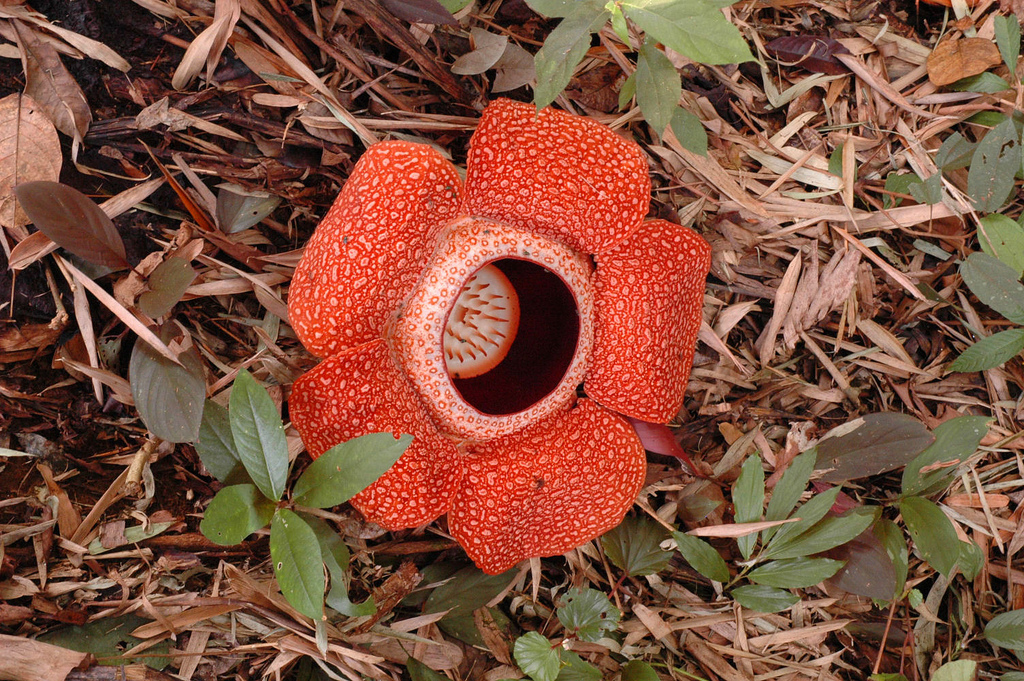
Rafflesia keithii, named in honour of Harry Keith. The bloom can reach one metre in diameter and is one of the largest flowers in the world.

Henry George Keith (1899–1982), known as Harry Keith, was a British forester and plant collector.

Keith is credited with starting the process of large-scale conservation of the forests of North Borneo (now Sabah).

In 1984, a new species of Rafflesia endemic to Sabah, Rafflesia keithii, was named in his honour. Keith was the husband of author Agnes Newton Keith. The couple had two children: a son (Henry George Newton Keith) and a daughter (Jean).

== Life ==
Henry George Keith Jr., nicknamed "Harry", was born in 1899 in New Plymouth, New Zealand. His father was born in Kentucky around 1868 to a Scottish father and an American mother born in West Virginia. Harry's mother, Agnes Emma Beale, was born in Ashwell, Herefordshire, England, in 1856.

Keith grew up in New Zealand before being sent abroad to be schooled in England and then in California. He served in the United States Navy in the First World War, and then took a degree at the University of California, Berkeley (B.Sc. 1924).

In 1925, Keith was appointed the Assistant Conservator of Forests for the government of North Borneo (now Sabah) under the Chartered Company, based at Sandakan, and was promoted to Conservator of Forests in 1931, and later again to Director of Agriculture and Wildlife. He was also Honorary Curator of the Sandakan Museum.

In 1934, Keith married Agnes Newton (1901-1982), an American who was later to become a celebrated writer. Keith had been a friend of Agnes' brother, Al, when both boys had been at the same school in San Diego. Keith had first met Agnes when she was eight years old and he was two years older. Keith had not seen Agnes in ten years when he visited California while on leave in 1934. They fell in love and married three days later. She accompanied him to North Borneo.

During the Japanese occupation of Borneo in World War II Keith was imprisoned at Berhala Island near Sandakan and then in Batu Lintang internment and POW camp near Kuching in Sarawak, as were Agnes and their infant son George. Agnes later wrote a book on their wartime experiences, Three Came Home, which was also made into a film.

After a short period of recuperation in Canada, Keith resumed his position as head of the Department of Agriculture in British North Borneo (1946-1952). Keith is credited with starting the process of large-scale conservation of North Borneo's forests. In 1931, the Forestry Department, under Keith's guidance, aimed to have at least 10% of the total land area of North Borneo created as Forest Reserves (the total in 1930 was 0.37%); after the interruption of World War II Keith observed that the Forestry Department's management of forest resources was one of 'exploitation' rather than 'sustained yield' and so in 1948, the 'sustained yield' Forest Policy was officially adopted by the Government, while also reaffirming the 10% aim. By 1984, some 45.4% of Sabah's land was designated a Forest Reserve.

After formal retirement from service in British North Borneo in 1952, Keith held several temporary appointments. In 1953, he joined the Food and Agriculture Organization (FAO) of the United Nations, and was posted to the Philippines as instructor at the Timber Graders School in Manila.

In 1955, Keith became FAO Representative at Benghazi in Libya, and served six years as forestry adviser in the country. He finally retired in 1964.

Throughout his career Keith collected plants for scientific study. His collections are now housed in the Natural History Museum and Kew Gardens in London, the Herbarium Bogoriense at Bogor Botanical Gardens in Indonesia, and the Herbarium of the Forest Department at Sandakan, Sabah.

All but one of his wife Agnes’ books are autobiographical and detail the family's life in the various countries in which they lived. Keith and Agnes retired to British Columbia, where they died within a few months of each other in 1982.

In 1984, a new species of Rafflesia endemic to Sabah, Rafflesia keithii, was named in Keith's honour. This parasitic plant is the largest Rafflesia found in Sabah, with flowers reaching up to one metre in diameter. In addition, Dryobalanops keithii, a heavy hardwood tree, and Randia keithii, a shrub or small tree in the genus Randia were also named after Keith.

== Newlands ==
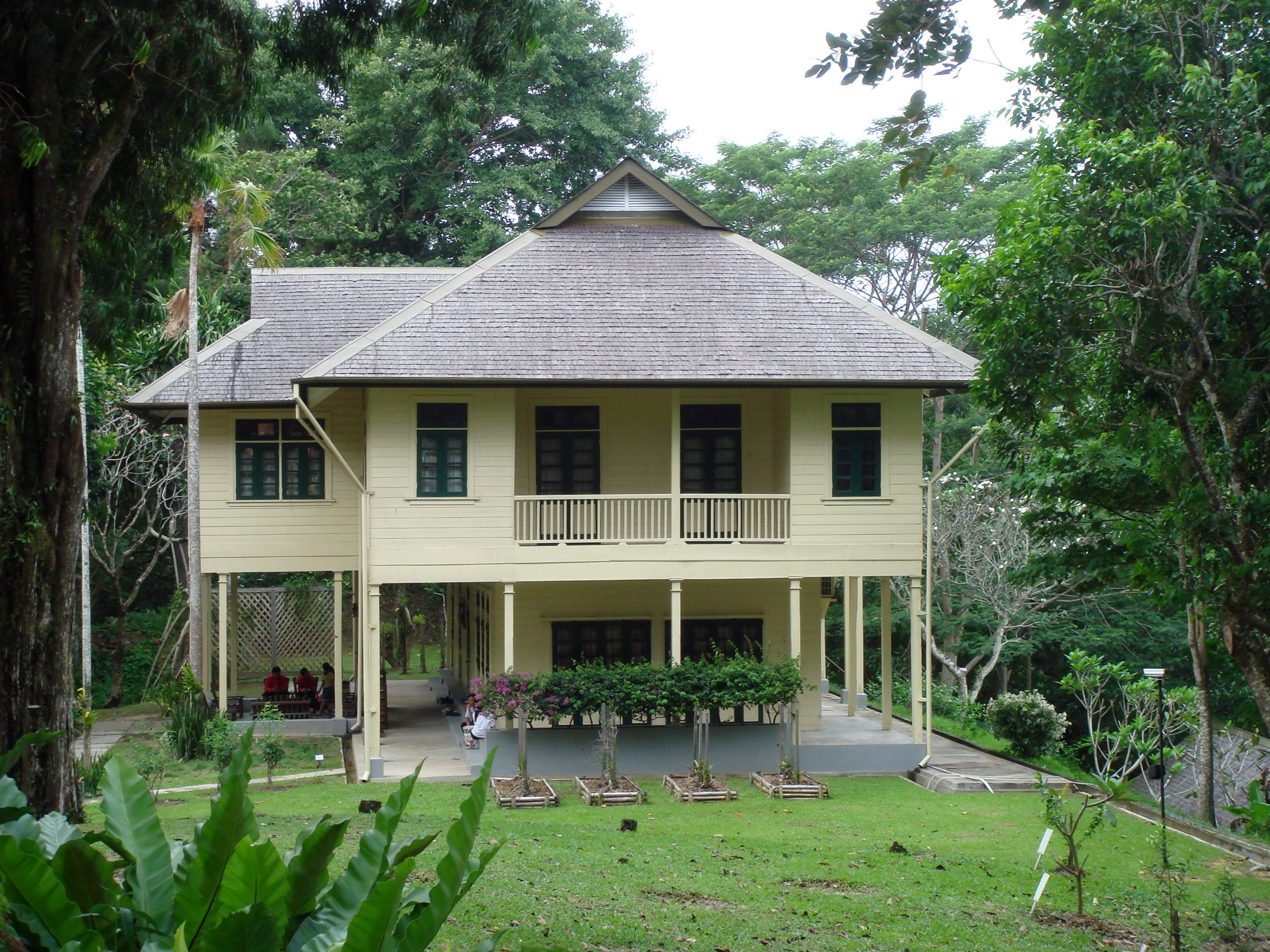
Newlands, the home of the Keiths in Sandakan. Photo taken in December 2007.

On arriving in Sandakan in 1934, the newly married couple moved into Keith's bachelor bungalow, but the couple soon relocated to a government building on a hilltop. They lived there until they were interned in 1942. After the war the Keiths returned to Sandakan to find the house destroyed. They built a new house in 1946–1947 on the original footprint and in a similar style to the original. They named this house Newlands and lived there until they left Sabah in 1952.

After nearly fifty years of gradual deterioration, first under tenants and then as an empty shell, the house was restored by Sabah Museum in collaboration with the Federal Department of Museums and Antiquities in 2001. The house is a rare survival of post-war colonial wooden architecture. It was opened to the public in 2004 and is a popular tourist attraction. It contains displays on Agnes and Harry Keith as well as information about colonial life in Sandakan in the first half of the twentieth century, and is commonly referred to as the Agnes Keith House.

== The Keiths' library ==
Both Agnes and Harry Keith were ardent bibliophiles. Agnes wrote of the first incarnation of their collection of books and documents on Borneo and South East Asia, which they were forced to abandon to the occupying Japanese forces, in Three Came Home: "Harry's library of Borneo books, perhaps the most complete in existence, his one self-indulgence...".

The pre-war collection was completely lost, and so the Keiths started a new collection from scratch after the war. Following their deaths, their collection was auctioned in 2002. The collection numbered over 1,000 volumes, and had been gathered over many years. The auction press release commented that "Many of these items are not listed in any institutional holdings, including the British Library, and may well be the only surviving extant copies". The British Library went on to purchase some of these books.

== Selected publications by Keith ==
- 1928 "Description of a native oil press (chandasan) from North Borneo" Journal of the Malayan Branch of the Royal Asiatic Society (JMBRAS) 6(3): 96–97
- 1935 Forestry in the State of North Borneo
- 1936 "A few Ulun-no-Bokan (Murut) taboos" JMBRAS 14(3): 327–329
- 1936 "Some Ulun-no-Bokan (Murut) charms" JMBRAS 14(3): 330
- 1936 "Some Ulun-no-Bokan (Murut) words from North Borneo" JMBRAS 14(3): 314–322
- 1936 "Ulun-no-Bokun (Murut) folklore" 'JMBRAS 14(3): 323–326
- 1938 A Preliminary List of North Borneo Plant Names North Borneo Forest Records, no. 2 (reprinted 1947; 2nd edition 1952, reprinted 1964). Hong Kong: Ye Olde Printerie
- 1938 "Keris measurements from North Borneo" JMBRAS 16(1): 134–136
- 1947 The Timber of North Borneo North Borneo Forest Records, no. 3. Hong Kong: Published by permission of the Government of the Colony of North Borneo, printed by Ye Olde Printerie
- 1947 "Megalithic Remains in North Borneo" JMBRAS 20(1): 153-5
- 1980 The United States Consul and the Yankee Raja Brunei Museum Journal Monograph 4
