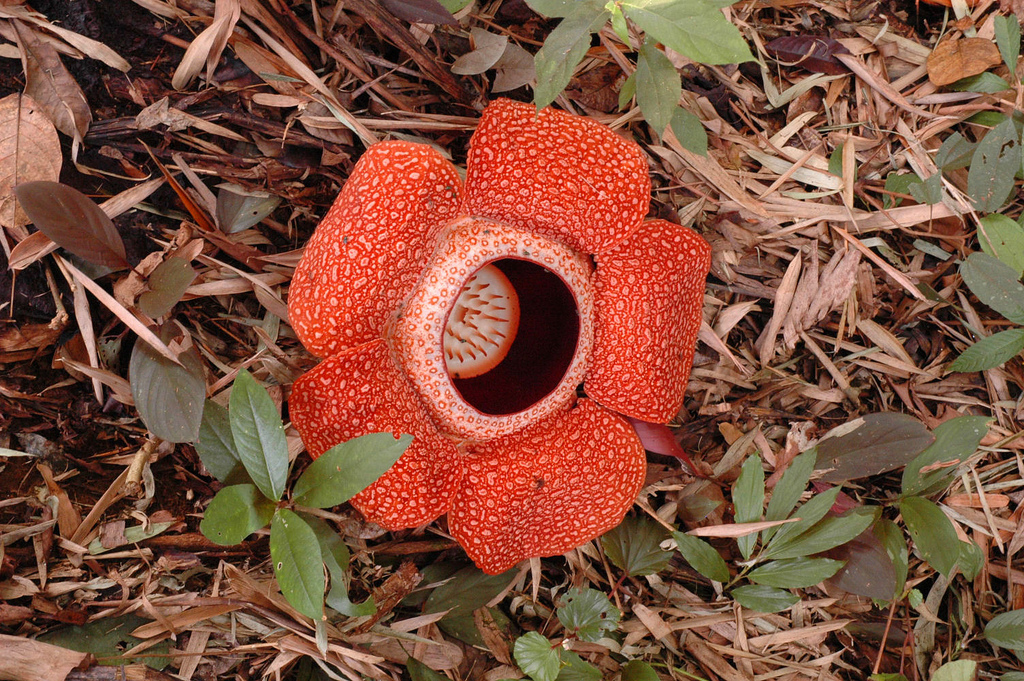
- Rafflesia keithii: this bloom measured approximately 80 cm in diameter

Scientific classification
- Kingdom: Plantae
- Clade: Tracheophytes
- Clade: Angiosperms
- Clade: Eudicots
- Clade: Rosids
- Order: Malpighiales
- Family: Rafflesiaceae
- Genus: Rafflesia
- Species: R. keithii

Binomial name
- Rafflesia keithii Meijer

= Rafflesia keithii =

Species of flowering plant

Rafflesia keithii is a species of flowering plant. The plant is native to Sabah.^{1} Sabah is a state that is located in northern Malaysia. Rafflesia keithii is the largest known species of Rafflesia found on this island.^{5} Like other members of the genus Rafflesia it lacks roots, leaves, and stems. This is because Rafflesia keithii grows directly on the roots of its host plant. The only downside is that it makes the flower bloom for a short period.^{1} It seems that the species of Rafflesia that grows in Malaysia blooms up to seven times a year.^{1} It is named after Henry (Harry) George Keith, former Conservator of Forests in North Borneo (now Sabah).

== Locations ==
Rafflesia has always been an ecotourism attraction in Malaysia, bringing in huge amounts of revenue for the country.^{1} Thirteen species of Rafflesia have been found in Malaysia, fifteen species have been discovered in the Philippines, and one species of Rafflesia has been found in Thailand, where the flower is a symbol of the Surat Thani Province and a delicacy for the local communities.^{1}

== Description ==
Once matured, Rafflesia keithii’s buds can come up to 24 cm in diameter.^{3} The flower petals can grow up to 50 cm in diameter from one petal end to the other. There are warts all along the petals of the flower. The rim of the opening in the middle has five rings of white spots, called the diaphragm, that are almost attached to each other.^{3} Along with white spots on the rim, the white wart spots cover the entire outer part of the flower. The middle circle of the flower is about 15 cm in diameter.^{3} The thorns inside of the flower are identified as processes. There are up to 42 processes in Rafflesia keithii.^{3}

== Life cycle ==
Although Rafflesia is observed and we know it is a parasitic plant, its life cycle is poorly understood, and new species are continuing to be discovered.

== Conservation status ==
There are huge conservation efforts all across Southeast Asia, including countries such as Brunei, Malaysia, Indonesia, the Philippines, and Thailand.^{1}Rafflesia keithii is among the many species of Rafflesia that are endangered in Malaysia.^{1} Since Rafflesia keithii and the twelve other species of Rafflesia in Malaysia are such an ecotourism attraction, huge conservation efforts have been imposed all across Peninsular Malaysia, with states like Sabah and Sarawak.^{1} Since the Rafflesia population can not be cultivated in captivity, it is only monitored by the park administration.^{1} A very ecotourist site in Sabah called Poring Hot Springs, where Rafflesia keithii is kept. However, the main approach for the Malaysian states is to designate Rafflesian habitats as high conservation value forests (HCVFs) or high conservation value areas (HCVAs) rather than trying to conserve or protect them.^{1} These were created and established in 1993 by the Forest Stewardship Council. Despite the efforts to preserve this species, concern about agricultural and plantation development in Malaysia is a danger to Rafflesia keithii and the entire species.^{1}
