= Sidney McCall =

American novelist and poet (1865–1954)

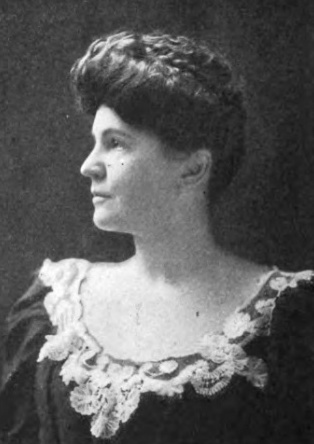
- Sidney McCall, from a 1907 publication
- Born: Mary McNeill; March 8, 1865; Wilcox County, Alabama, C.S.
- Died: January 11, 1954 (aged 88); Montrose, Alabama, U.S.
- Occupation: Novelist

Sidney McCall (March 8, 1865 – January 11, 1954), born Mary McNeill, later Mary McNeil Fenollosa, was an American novelist and poet. Several of her novels were adapted into films.

== Biography ==
McCall was born Mary McNeill (later dropping one of the l's) in Wilcox County, Alabama, to William Stoddard McNeill, a Confederate Army lieutenant from Mobile, Alabama, and Laura Sibley. McCall was the oldest of five children.

At the age of 18 she married Ludolph Chester who died two years later, leaving her with an infant child. She received a proposal of marriage from W. Ledyard Scott, a former suitor then serving as a professor of English and Latin at Zoshikwan College in Kagoshima, Japan. After sailing to Tokyo, she married Scott in 1890. However, the marriage was not a happy one and in 1892, she divorced Scott and returned to the United States, now with two children.

In 1895 while working at the Asian art division of the Boston Museum of Fine Arts, she became an assistant to Ernest Fenollosa, a renowned American expert on Japanese art and culture. The two became romantically involved, and Fenollosa’s wife divorced him over the affair, causing a social scandal in Boston and his subsequent dismissal from his post at the MFA. Forced to leave his post at the museum, Fenollosa moved with Mary to New York, but the couple returned to Japan in 1897 following a long honeymoon cruise.

== Selected works ==
- Out of the Nest: A Flight of Verses (1899) poetry, under her own name
- Truth Dexter (1901) novel, as Sidney McCall
- Hiroshige, the Artist of Mist, Snow and Rain (1901) essay, under her own name
- The Breath of the Gods : A Japanese Romance of To-day (1905), as Sidney McCall
- The Dragon Painter (1906) under her own name
- Red Horse Hill (1909) novel, as Sidney McCall
- Foreword to Epochs of Chinese and Japanese Art: An Outline History of East Asiatic Design (1912) by Ernest Fenollosa^{*}
- Blossoms from a Japanese Garden: A Book of Child-Verses (1913) poetry, under her own name
- The Strange Woman (1914) novel, as Sidney McCall
- Ariadne of Allan Water (1914) novel, as Sidney McCall
- The Stirrup Latch (1915) novel, as Sidney McCall
- Sunshine Beggars (1918) novel, as Sidney McCall
- Christopher Laird (1919) novel, as Sidney McCall

Mary Fenollosa was also responsible for the posthumous completion, checking and publication of her late husband's work Epochs of Chinese and Japanese Art.

== Films ==
The Breath of the Gods is based on her novel of the same name. The Eternal Mother, a lost 1917 silent film, is based on her Red Horse Hill. The Dragon Painter (1919) is based on her novel The Dragon Painter.

The cover of Sidney McCall's novel, The Breath of the Gods (1905).
