= The Aesthetics of Shadow =

2013 book by Daisuke Miyao on cinema of Japan

The Aesthetics of Shadow: Lighting and Japanese Cinema
- First edition
- Author: Daisuke Miyao
- Genre: Non-fiction
- Publisher: Duke University Press
- Publication date: 2013

The Aesthetics of Shadow: Lighting and Japanese Cinema is a 2013 book written by Daisuke Miyao. As the title suggests, the book is based on the cinema of Japan.
