= The Dragon Painter (novel) =

The Dragon Painter (1906)

The Dragon Painter is a 1906 novel written by Mary McNeil Fenollosa. A review published in the Los Angeles Herald called it the author's "ripest and most artistic work". The 1919 American film The Dragon Painter, starring Sessue Hayakawa and Tsuru Aoki was based on it.
