= Agnes Newton Keith =

American novelist and memoirist (1901–1982)

- Portrait of Agnes Newton Keith
- Born: Agnes Jones Goodwillie Newton; July 4, 1901 Oak Park, Illinois, U.S.
- Died: March 30, 1982 (aged 80) Oak Bay, British Columbia, Canada
- Notable works: Three Came Home (1947)
- Spouse: Harry Keith (m. 1934)
- Children: 2

Agnes Newton Keith (born Agnes Jones Goodwillie Newton; July 4, 1901 – March 30, 1982) was an American writer best known for her three autobiographical accounts of life in North Borneo (now Sabah) before, during, and after World War II. The second of these, Three Came Home, tells of her time in Japanese prisoner-of-war camp and civilian internee camp in North Borneo and Sarawak, and was made into a film of the same name in 1950. She published seven books in all.

== Early life ==
Agnes Jones Goodwillie Newton was born in Oak Park, Illinois. Her family moved to Hollywood, California, when she was very young. Her father was one of the founders of the Del Monte Company. One of her grandmothers was English. The family moved again when Agnes was ten, this time to the nearby beach community of Venice, California, for her younger brother Al's health.

She attended the University of California, Berkeley, where she became a member of the Omicron chapter of Alpha Gamma Delta. Upon graduation, Keith landed a job with the San Francisco Examiner. She covered stories including the 1925 case of 16 year-old flapper, Dorothy Ellingson, convicted of matricide. Eight months after starting her journalism career, she was attacked by an assailant who was convinced that the newspaper was persecuting him by printing Krazy Kat cartoons. She received serious head injuries which affected her memory. She also became seriously depressed, and after two years of illness her father sent her and her brother Al to Europe to recuperate. Returning refreshed to the States, Agnes decided to become a writer, but soon afterwards lost her eyesight for two years as a delayed result of her injuries. During this period she studied dancing, modelled clothes and 'did bits in the movies'.

== Family life ==
In 1934, she married Henry G. Keith, known as "Harry Keith," an Englishman. He had been a friend of her brother Al when both boys had been at the same school in San Diego, and Agnes had first met him when she was eight years old. He had gone on to work for the government of North Borneo, and she had not seen him in a decade when he visited California while on leave in 1934. However, as soon as they re-met they decided to get married, and were wed three days later. Three months after their marriage, following an operation to cure Agnes's eyesight, they sailed for Borneo.

Their son, Henry George Newton Keith, was born on April 5, 1940. Their daughter Jean is mentioned, though not by name, in Keith's first book, Land Below the Wind, on page 174 of the first edition, dated 1939: "A picture stood on the table by us of our little girl at home in her party dress." On page 171, while discussing the small local boy, Usit with Harry, she says, "I'm afraid I'm too lazy to take on the job of being a parent again." Copies of White Man Returns are dedicated "To my children George and Jean". Jean was invited to the celebrations for the reissue of Land Below the Wind in Sabah on July 6, 2007.

== Life in Borneo ==
Agnes' husband Harry was Conservator of Forests and Director of Agriculture for the government of North Borneo under the Chartered Company, and was also Honorary Curator of the Sandakan (State) Museum. He had worked in Borneo since 1925, and was based in Sandakan. Agnes spent an idyllic five years at Sandakan, sometimes accompanying her husband on trips into the interior of the country. Harry persuaded her to write about her experiences and enter it in the 1939 Atlantic Monthly Non-Fiction Prize contest. The judges voted unanimously for her entry to win, and it was partly serialized in the magazine before being published in November of that year as Land Below the Wind. The book received favorable reviews: The Scotsman described it as "A delightful book ... It has abundant humour and a pervading charm ... An original and engaging description of a country and people of extraordinary interest."

The Keiths were on leave in Canada when war was declared on September 3, 1939. Harry was immediately ordered back to Borneo.

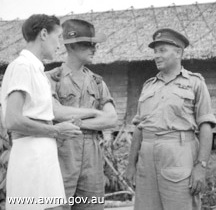
Agnes Newton Keith (left) speaking with Major T. T. Johnson, 2/6 Field Park Company (centre) and Brigadier T. C. Eastick (right), Commander of the Kuching Force of the Australian 9th Division, shortly after the Australians liberated the camp at Batu Lintang, Kuching on 11 September 1945.

The Japanese invading forces landed in Sandakan on January 19, 1942. For the first few months of Japanese occupation of British Borneo, the Keiths were allowed to stay in their own home. On 12 May Agnes and George were imprisoned on Berhala Island (Pulau Berhala) near Sandakan, in a building that had once been the Government Quarantine Station, along with other Western women and children. Harry was imprisoned nearby. They spent eight months there before Agnes and George were sent to Kuching in Sarawak. They left by a small steamer on January 12, 1943, and arrived eight days later. They were imprisoned in Batu Lintang camp near Kuching, unusual in that it accommodated both prisoners of war and civilian internees in between eight and ten separate compounds. Harry later arrived at the camp. The camp was finally liberated on 11 September 1945 by the 9th Australian Army Division under the command of Brigadier T. C. Eastick. All three members of the Keith family had survived their internment.

Although punishable by death if discovered, many inmates of the camp, both civilian and POW, kept diaries and notes about their imprisonment. One of Agnes' fellow female internees, Hilda E. Bates, described her in her diary entry dated September 21, 1944:

Among my companions in camp are some outstanding personalities, and the following [is one] of these. Mrs A.K. – a noted American novelist, who proposes to [write] a book on our life here. She is much sought after by the Japanese Camp Commandant, as he has read one of her previous books about Borneo. He evidently holds the opinion that a cup of [coffee] given in his office, and a packet of biscuits as a gift for her small son, will ensure him appearing as a hero in said book!

Mrs A.K. has an unusual appearance, being six feet in height, very thin, and with the stealthy lops of a Red Indian. She dresses in a startling and very flamboyant fashion, in very bright colours, while her hair is worn in two plaits, one over each shoulder, thus adding to a slightly Indian aura!

Mary Baldwin, a 70-year-old fellow-internee, did not get on well with Agnes, suspecting that she was "too ready to be polite and co-operative with the Japanese guards and their officers in return for favours – notably food and medicine for her infant son."

Book cover of Three Came Home

After their liberation and a short period on Labuan Island for rest and recuperation, the Keiths returned to Victoria, British Columbia, where Harry had had a small country house since his bachelor days. In February 1946 he was asked to return to Borneo by the new Colonial Administration, which had taken over from the Chartered Company. He was to be in charge of food production. He agreed to go, so he and his family were split yet again. The couple remained in Victoria, and Agnes worked on her second book, an autobiographical account of her imprisonment: on her release Agnes had gathered up her notes and diary entries from their various hiding places, and she used them as the basis for her book, Three Came Home, which was published in April 1947. It detailed the hardships and deprivations that the internees and POWs had undergone under the Japanese, and became a bestseller.

In 1950, it was turned into a motion picture, with Claudette Colbert playing the role of Agnes. Agnes and George finally returned to Sandakan in 1947, a full year after Harry. Borneo was a much-changed place, having suffered doubly, first under the Japanese occupation then from the ferocious Allied attacks as the liberation of the island took place. In 1951 the third book in Agnes's Borneo trilogy was published, entitled White Man Returns. This chronicled the time from Agnes's and George's return to Borneo up through December 1950. The Keiths remained in Sandakan until 1952.

=== Newlands ===
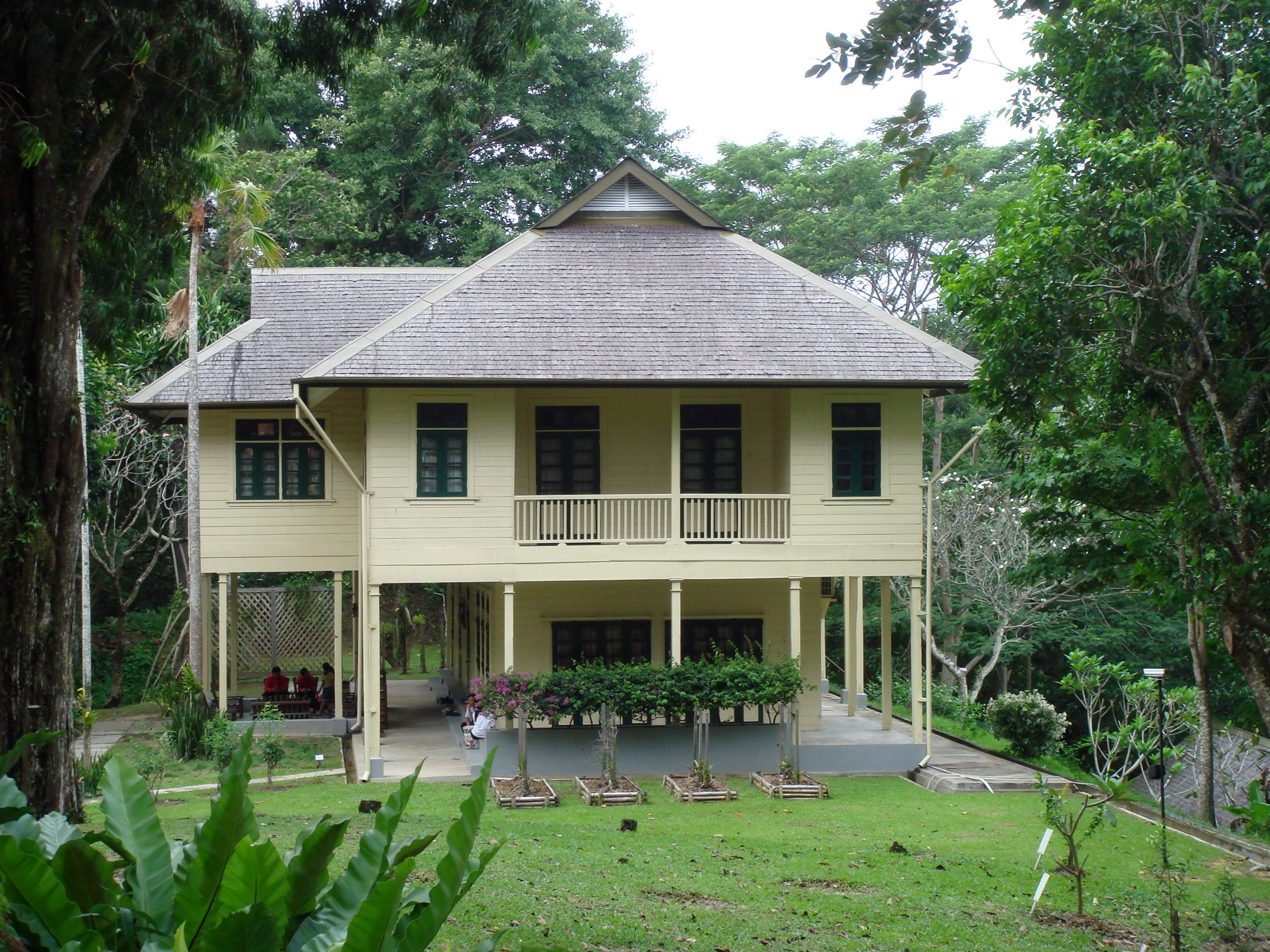
Newlands, the postwar home of the Keiths in Sandakan. Photo taken in Dec 2007.

On arriving in Sandakan in 1934, Agnes moved into Harry's bachelor bungalow, but the couple soon relocated to a government building on a hilltop, where they lived until internment in 1942. After the war they returned to Sandakan to find the house destroyed. They built a new house in 1946–47 on the original footprint and in a similar style to the original. They named this house Newlands and lived there until they left Sabah in 1952. After nearly 50 years of gradual deterioration, first under tenants and then as an empty shell, the house was restored by Sabah Museum in collaboration with the Federal Department of Museums and Antiquities in 2001. The house is a rare survival of post-war colonial wooden architecture.

It was opened to the public in 2004 and is a popular tourist attraction. It contains displays on Agnes and Harry Keith as well as information about colonial life in Sandakan in the first half of the twentieth century, and is commonly referred to as the Agnes Keith House.

== Philippines, Libya and later years ==
In 1953 Harry joined the Food and Agriculture Organization (FAO) of the United Nations, and was posted to the Philippines, based in Manila. Agnes wrote Bare Feet in the Palace about post-war life in the Philippines, culminating in the 1953 election. It was published in 1955. Harry became FAO Representative in Libya, and served six years as forestry adviser in the country. He retired in 1964.

True to form, she wrote about her experiences in the country, publishing Children of Allah, between the Sea and the Sahara in 1966. In 1959, she was named an Alpha Gamma Delta Distinguished Citizen. The Keiths retired to British Columbia, where Agnes continued writing. Her first novel, Beloved Exiles, was published in 1972. It was set in North Borneo in the period between 1936 and 1951. Her last book, Before the Blossoms Fall: Life and Death in Japan, was published in 1975.

== Death ==
Agnes Newton Keith died at age 80 in Oak Bay, British Columbia on March 30, 1982. Her husband died a few months later the same year.

== The Keiths' library ==
Agnes and Harry Keith were ardent bibliophiles. Following their deaths in 1982, their collection of books and documents on Borneo and South East Asia was auctioned in 2002. The collection numbered over 1,000 volumes, and had been gathered over many years. She wrote of the collection, which they were forced to abandon to the occupying Japanese forces, in Three Came Home: "Harry's library of Borneo books, perhaps the most complete in existence, his one self-indulgence...". The auction press release commented: "Many of these items are not listed in any institutional holdings, including the British Library, and may well be the only surviving extant copies."

== Legacy ==
The title of Agnes's first book about the then North Borneo, Land Below the Wind, has become the unofficial motto of Sabah. The phrase was used by sailors to describe all the lands south of the typhoon belt, but Agnes popularised the special connection of the phrase with Sabah, by applying it exclusively to North Borneo in her book.

== Works by Agnes Newton Keith ==
- Keith, Agnes Newton (November 1939). Land Below the Wind. Boston, Mass: Little Brown and Company. OCLC 7058327.
- Keith, Agnes Newton (April 1947). Three Came Home. Boston, Mass: Little Brown and Company. OCLC 394895.
- Keith, Agnes Newton (1951). White Man Returns. Boston, Mass: Little Brown and Company. ISBN 9780708903445. OCLC 876502.
- Keith, Agnes Newton (1955). Bare Feet in the Palace. Boston, Mass: Little Brown and Company. OCLC 411630.
- Keith, Agnes Newton (1966). Children of Allah, between the Sea and the Sahara. Boston, Mass: Little Brown and Company. OCLC 412825.
- Keith, Agnes Newton (1972). Beloved Exiles. Boston, Mass: Little Brown and Company. OCLC 278520.
- Keith, Agnes Newton (1975). Before the Blossoms Fall: Life and Death in Japan. Boston, Mass: Atlantic Monthly-Little, Brown and Company. ISBN 978-0-316-48630-9. OCLC 1339825.
