= Agnes Keith House =

Museum in Sabah, Malaysia

- Rumah Agnes Keith
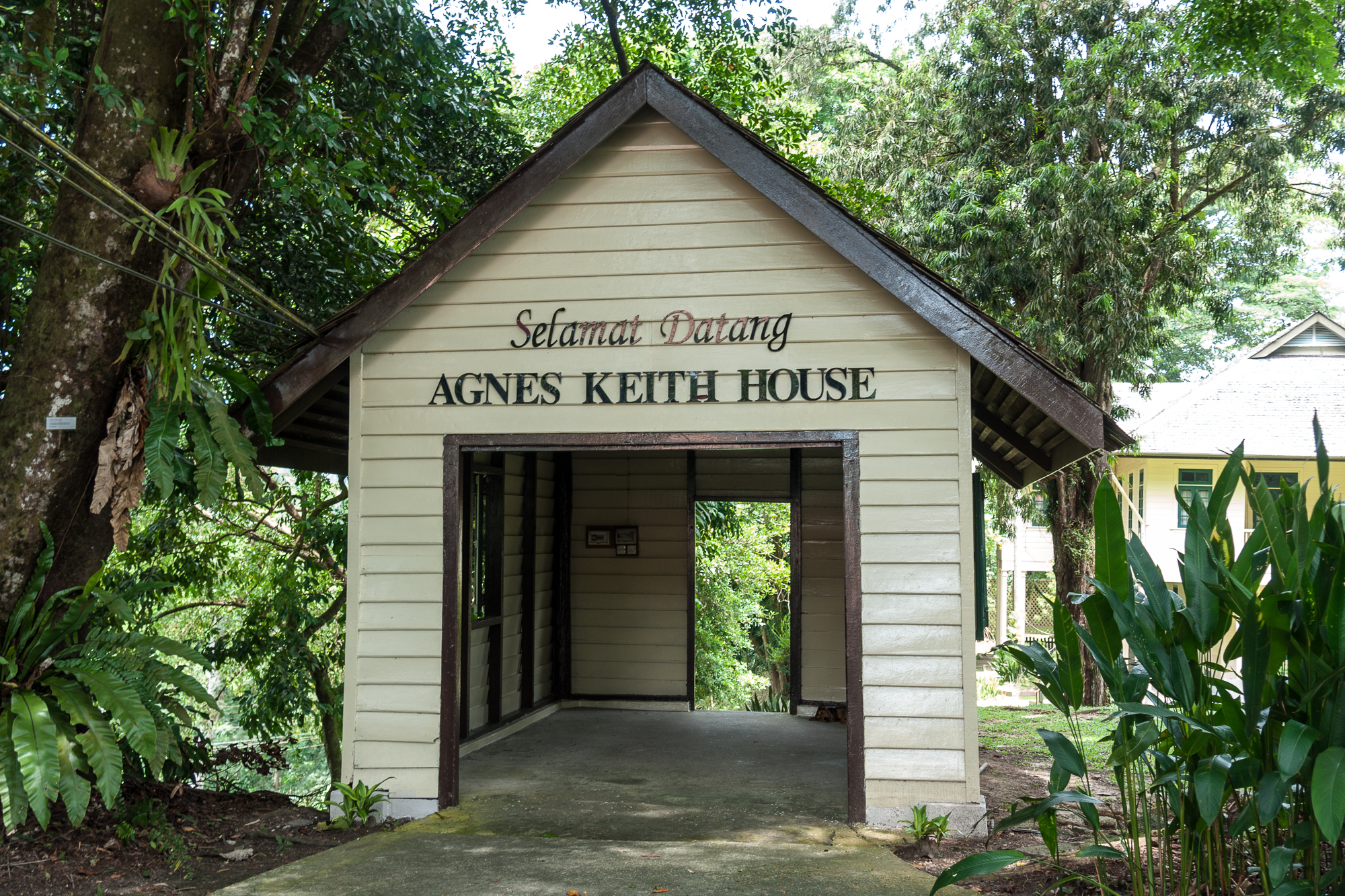
- Former name: Newlands
- Established: 26 April 2004
- Location: Sandakan District, Sandakan Division, Sabah
- Coordinates: 5°50′33.77″N 118°06′58.82″E
- Type: Historic house
- Owner: Sabah Museum

Agnes Keith House (formerly known as the Newlands) (Malay: Rumah Agnes Keith) is a historic house museum in Sandakan District, Sandakan Division, Sabah, Malaysia. The museum is named after Agnes Newton Keith, an American author known for her three autobiographical accounts of life in British North Borneo.

== History ==
A house is already constructed on a hill in the current site of the house as a British colonial government quarters. In 1934, Agnes married Harry Keith, a British official assigned for forest conservation in Sandakan. Harry had provided a house for them and they've been living there together for years, but since it had been destroyed through war, both chose not to rebuild their house in the former location. After World War II, the new house was rebuilt between 1946 until 1947 on the hill of a destroyed house and became the first government permanent timber dwelling. The newly rebuilt and more comfortable house on the hill is located on the site of a destroyed house formerly owned by M.M Clark where they renamed the new house as Newlands. Agnes lived in the new house for several years before the house changed ownership to other owners. After being left with no further occupants, the Sabah Museum Department together with Federal Department of Museum and Antiquities began to collaborate in 2001 to restore the house and as on 26 April 2004, it was finally opened to the public as a museum.

== Haunted reputation ==
Through her years of living in the house, based on her own writings, Agnes is reportedly happy with the home, although there were some mysterious incidents of note that had happened throughout her stay in the house when Agnes everyday saw a tall unrecognisable female figure apparition. At one event she saw the apparition with her family; saying goodbye to her husband and taking her own baby before returning to the road in front of the house with the apparition's body moving forward while her head managed to keep looking straight behind (towards Agnes position).

The same horror experienced earlier by Agnes also felt by the next house owner following Agnes return to the United States; a new female owner named Rosemary (living in the house from 1955 to 1967), the wife of G.L Carson while sleeping alone in the house awaken by the sounds of a room door located at the end of the house being closed several times in early dawn and hearing footsteps that getting louder moving towards her room before shockingly seeing an unrecognisable female apparition suddenly appeared at the end of her bed with eyes staring at her when she began to open her own eyes that causing her to be quickly fainted. Another incident involving a housemaid who working in the house from 1967 to 1968 saw a similar female apparition standing in the house stairs.

== Features ==
The house has been restored and turned into a heritage house since the restoration works in 2004. The house provides insights to life during the administration of British North Borneo and is furnished with a reproduction of colonial furniture and antiques. A gallery on the first floor tells the story of Agnes, her books and her family.

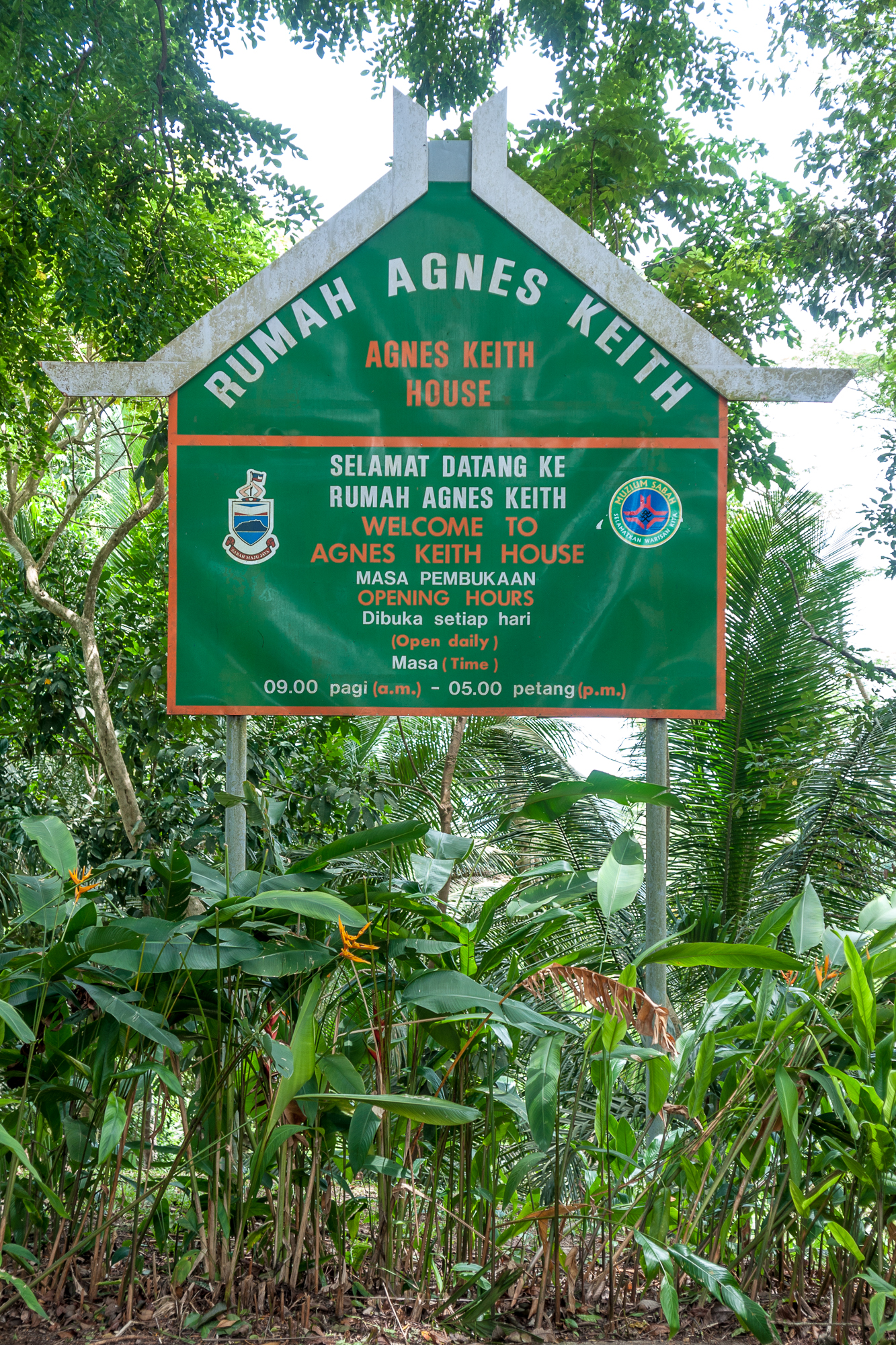
Signboard outside the house compound.

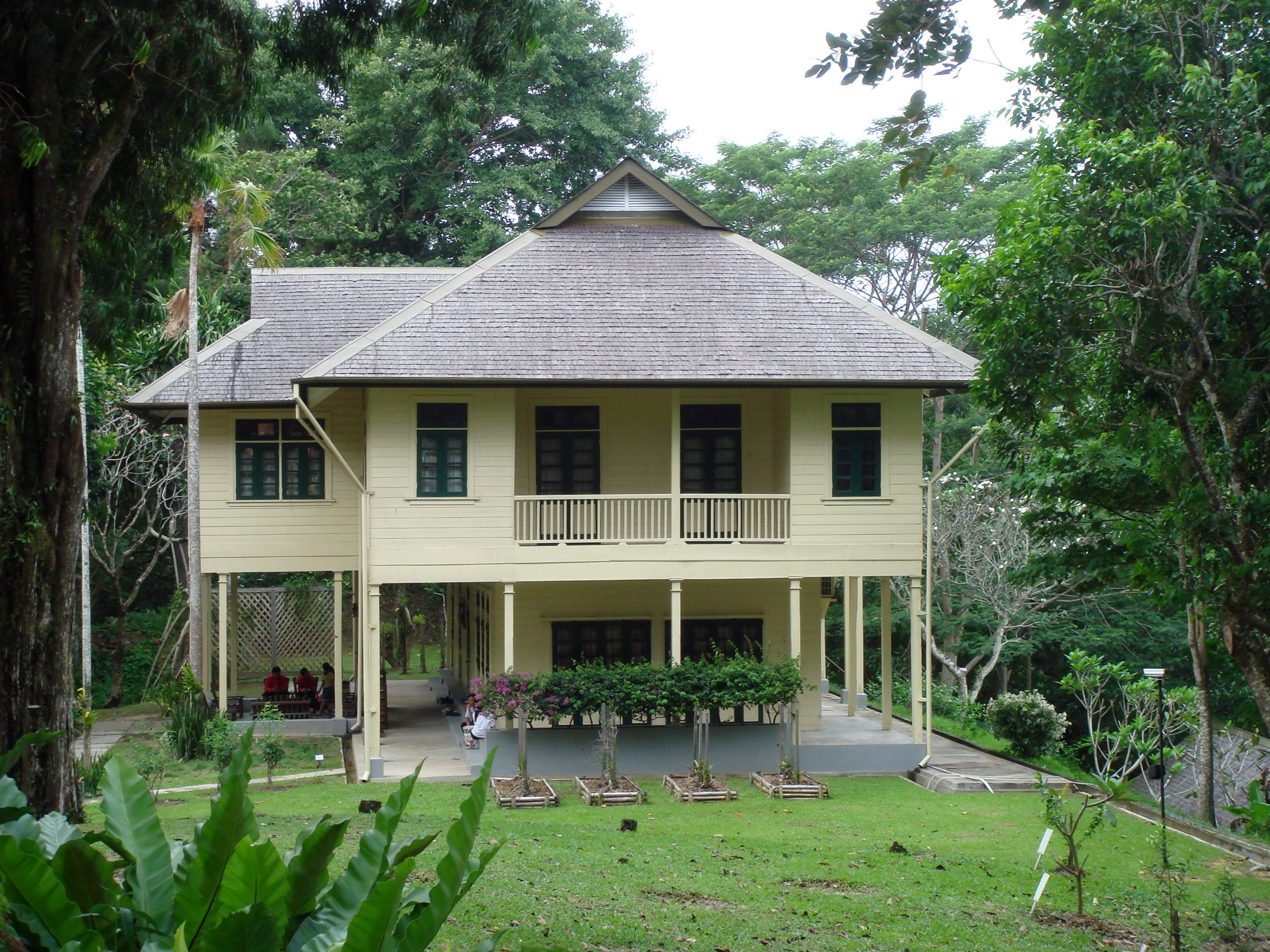
The house as seen from outside.

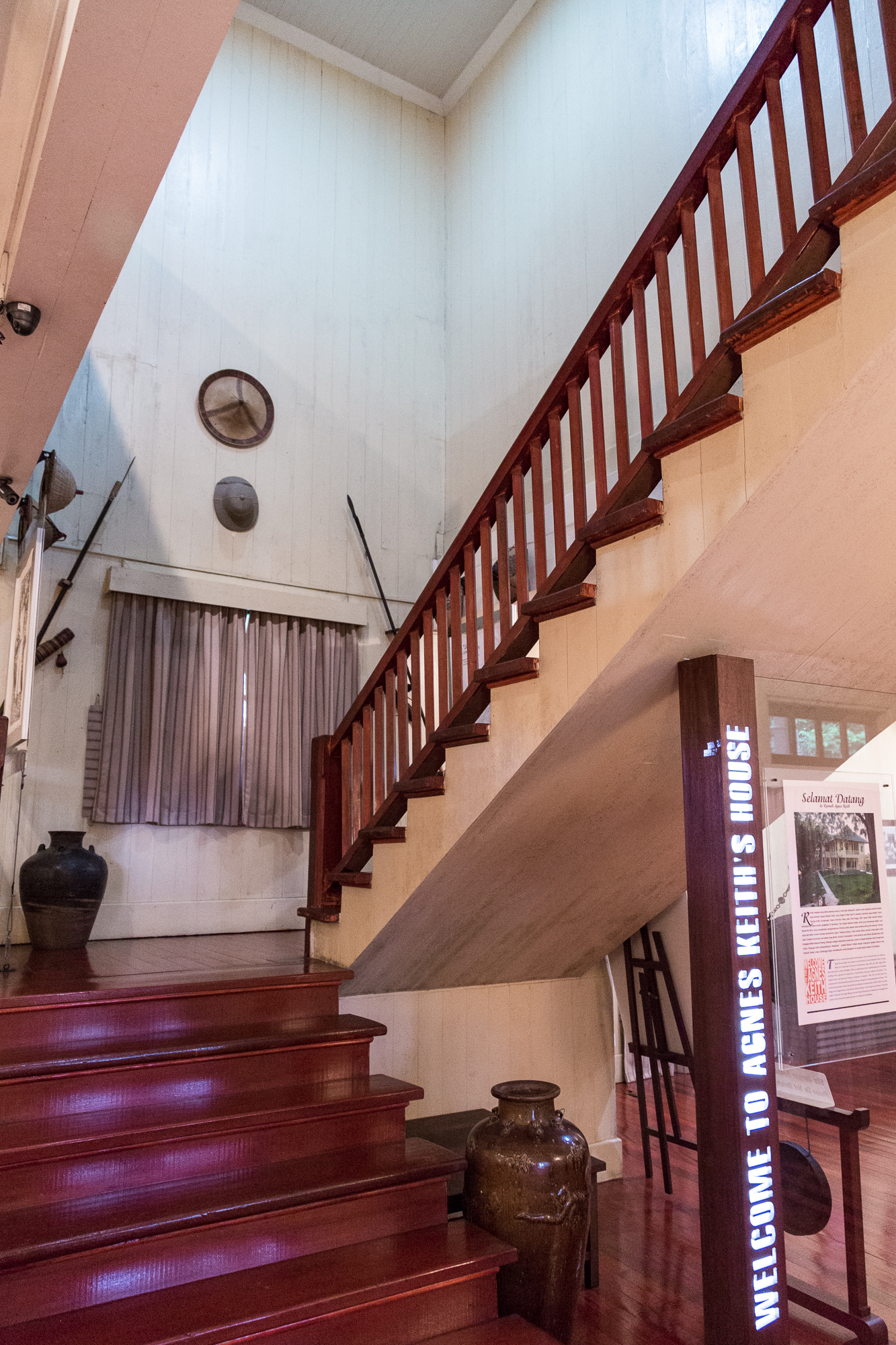
Stairs inside the house.

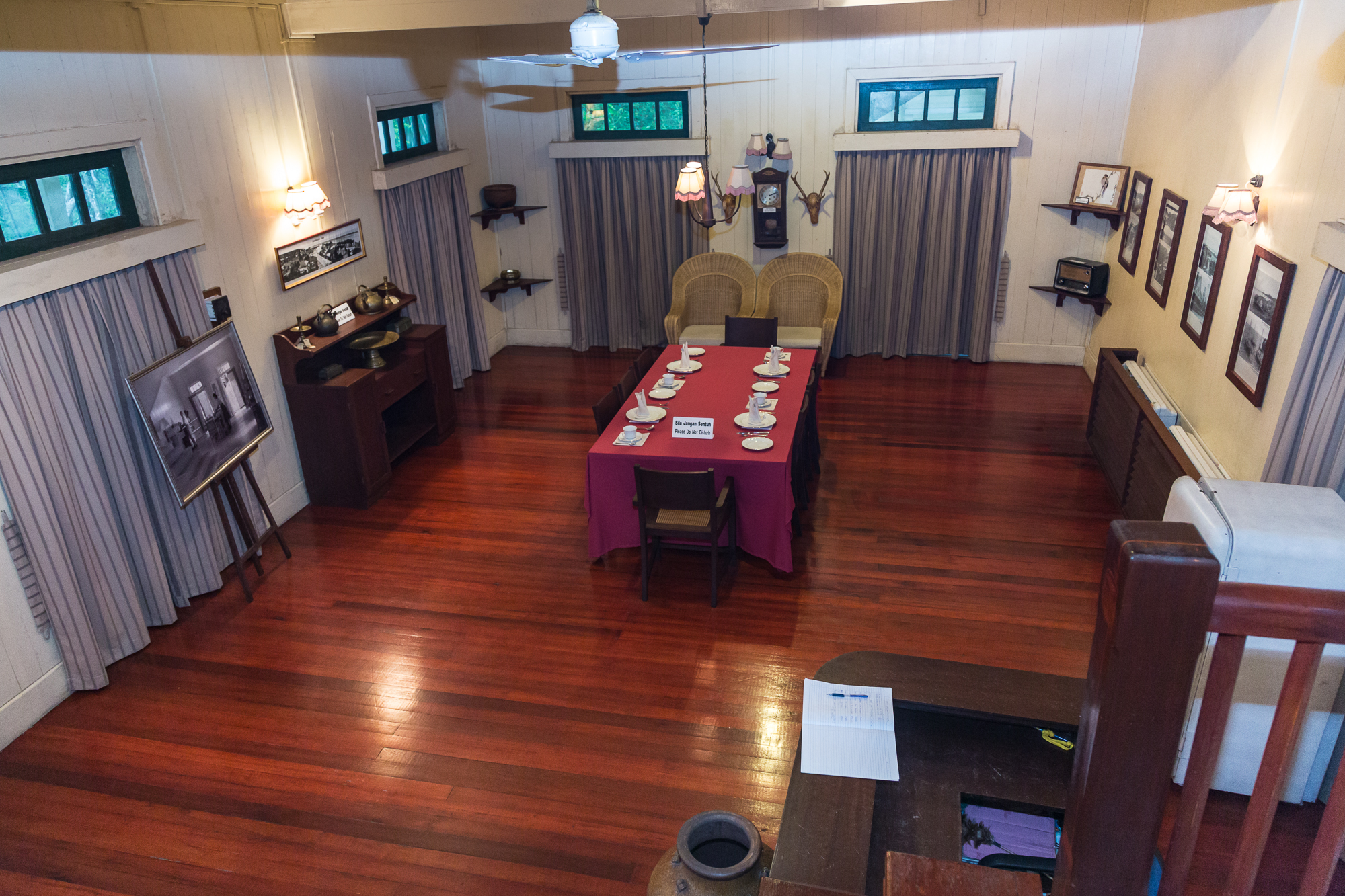
Inside the house.

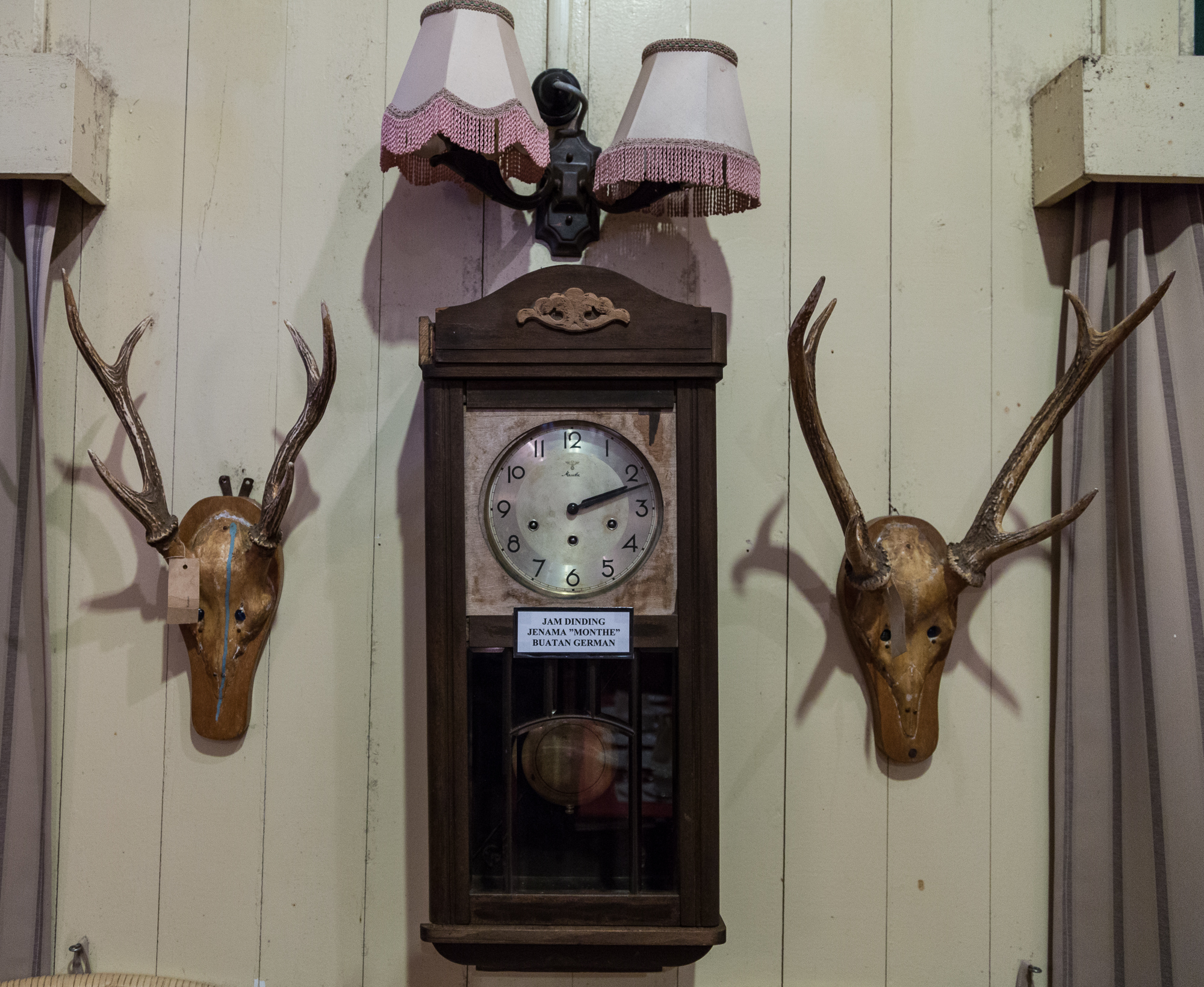
Antique accessories.

== See also ==
- List of museums in Malaysia
