= Oxford Handbook of Japanese Cinema =

Book by Daisuke Miyao

- Editor: Daisuke Miyao
- Publisher: Oxford University Press
- Publication date: 2010
- ISBN: 9780199731664

Oxford Handbook of Japanese Cinema is a 2010 non-fiction book published by Oxford University Press and edited by Daisuke Miyao.
