= Daisuke Miyao =

Daisuke Miyao is a professor of Japanese films at the University of Oregon and the University of California San Diego. He is also the author of Sessue Hayakawa: Silent Cinema and Transnational Stardom and The Aesthetics of Shadow: Lighting and Japanese Cinema, editor of Oxford Handbook of Japanese Cinema and co-translator of Ozu's Anti-Cinema.
