= Batu Lintang camp =

Japanese-run WWII internment camp in Kuching, Sarawak

- Kuching, Sarawak
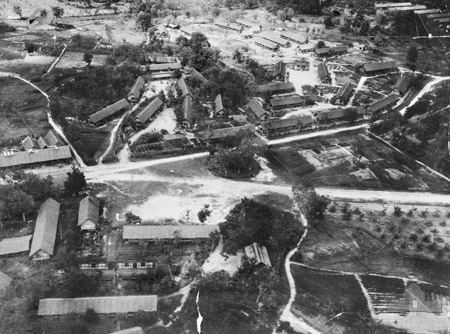
- Aerial view of part of Batu Lintang camp, on or after 29 August 1945. In the foreground is the Roman Catholic priests' compound. The central open area is one of the parade grounds; beyond that is the main enclosure containing the camps of the British other ranks, the Indonesian soldiers and the male civilian internees. The female civilian internees' camp is just visible at top right. Three panel signals to the liberating forces are visible on the roof of the long building parallel to the track on the left edge of the photograph

Site information
- Type: POW and civilian internee camp
- Controlled by: Empire of Japan

Location
- Coordinates: 1°31′51″N 110°20′53″E

Site history
- Built: Early 1941 as military barracks; expanded significantly by the Japanese
- In use: March 1942 – September 1945
- Fate: Converted into Teachers' Training College in 1947

Garrison information
- Occupants: Allied POWs and civilian internees (mostly British, Australian and Dutch; a few Indonesian, American and Canadian)

Batu Lintang camp (also known as Lintang Barracks and Kuching POW camp) at Kuching, Sarawak on the island of Borneo was a Japanese-run internment camp during the Second World War. It was unusual in that it housed both Allied prisoners of war (POWs) and civilian internees. The camp, which operated from March 1942 until the liberation of the camp in September 1945, was housed in buildings that were originally British Indian Army barracks. The original area was extended by the Japanese, until it covered about 50 acres (20 hectares). The camp population fluctuated, due to movement of prisoners between camps in Borneo, and as a result of the deaths of the prisoners. It had a maximum population of some 3,000 prisoners.

Life in the camp was harsh, with POWs and internees alike forced to endure food shortages, disease and sickness for which scant medicine was made available, forced labour, brutal treatment, and lack of adequate clothing and living quarters. Of the approximately 2,000 British POWs held there, over two-thirds died during or as a result of their captivity. The construction and operation of a secret radio receiver for over 2 1/2 years, from February 1943 until the liberation of the camp, was a morale booster and allowed the prisoners to follow the progress of the war. Discovery would have resulted in certain death for those involved.

Following the unconditional surrender of Japan on 15 August 1945, the camp was liberated on 11 September 1945 by the Australian 9th Division. On liberation, the camp population was 2,024, of whom 1,392 were POWs, 395 were male civilian internees and 237 were civilian women and children. Amongst official Japanese papers found at the camp following its liberation were two "death orders". Both described the proposed method of execution of every POW and internee in the camp. The first order, scheduled for enactment on 17 or 18 August, was not carried out; the second was scheduled to take place on 15 September. The timely liberation of the camp may have prevented the murder of over 2,000 men, women and children.

In July 1948, a teachers' training college moved to the site, where it continues to this day, the oldest such establishment in Malaysia.

== Location and organisation ==
Kuching lies some 35 kilometres (22 mi) up the Sarawak River from the sea; the camp was situated some 5 kilometres (3.1 mi) to the southeast of Kuching.

The barracks were built by the Sarawak Government in early 1941, when Britain, in agreement with the Rajah of Sarawak, sent the 2nd Battalion, 15th Punjab Regiment of the British Indian Army (2/15th Punjab Regiment) to defend Sarawak in case of attack by the Japanese. The camp, known from its inception as Batu Lintang, was near completion for occupation by May 1941.

The Japanese first invaded the island of Borneo in mid December 1941, landing on the west coast near Miri; invasion was completed by 23 January 1942 when they landed at Balikpapan on the east coast.

The first Allied prisoners held in the camp were about 340 British and Indian soldiers who were interned there in mid-March 1942. In time, it held both Allied POWs and Allied civilian internees. Local Sarawakians including ethnic Chinese were not interned in the camp, although some were imprisoned in Kuching jail. Allied civilian prisoners came almost exclusively from different territories on Borneo: from North Borneo (now Sabah), from Brunei, from the Straits Settlements island of Labuan, and from Sarawak, all of which were under British control, and from Dutch Borneo (now Kalimantan). In contrast, the POWs were brought to Batu Lintang from places such as mainland Malaya and Java as well as from Borneo. Many spent time at transit or temporary camps, such as the one at Berhala Island, North Borneo, prior to their transfer to Batu Lintang. The camp officially opened on 15 August 1942, at which time a commemoration stone was erected at the camp.

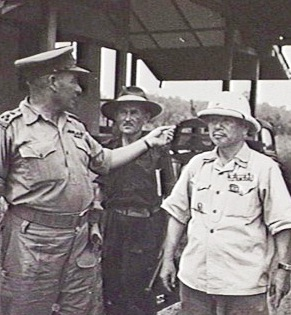
The camp commander, Lt.-Col. Tatsuji Suga (right) with Brigadier Thomas Eastick (left) and Lt.-Col. A. W. Walsh (centre) shortly after the liberation of Batu Lintang on 11 September 1945. Suga killed himself five days later.

The camp commandant was Lieutenant-Colonel (Lt.-Col.) Tatsuji Suga. Suga was the commandant of all POW and internees' camps in Borneo; there were others at Jesselton (later Kota Kinabalu), Sandakan and briefly on Labuan island and also at Tarakan, Banjarmasin and Kandangan; Suga was often absent from Batu Lintang as a result. His second-in-command was Lieutenant (later Captain) Nagata; some sources say Negata or Nekata. Most of the camp guards were Koreans, with a few Formosans (Taiwanese). There was a range of administrative buildings, quartermaster's stores, guard houses, guards' quarters and a camp hospital. Throughout its operation, all the camps at Batu Lintang, including the internee ones, were conducted under prisoner-of-war rules.

The entire camp was surrounded by a 8 kilometres (5.0 mi) perimeter barbed wire fence. The internees were segregated into categories and assigned separate compounds, each of which was also surrounded by barbed wire fencing. There were 8–10 compounds, although their make-up varied through the period of operation of the camp. The make-up was determined by the arrival and departure of different groups of prisoners as Batu Lintang camp was also used as a transit camp: at one point some of the Australian and British soldiers who were later to die on the Sandakan Death Marches were held at the camp. Contact between the inhabitants of the different compounds was forbidden and transgressors were severely punished.

The main groups of POWs were British officers, Australian officers and non-commissioned officers (NCOs), Royal Netherlands East Indies Army (KNIL) officers, British Other Ranks, British Indian Army (2nd/15th Punjab Regiment) personnel, Netherlands East Indies (Indonesian) KNIL soldiers. The British and Australian personnel had mostly been sent from Malaya and Singapore, after the Allied surrender there, whereas the KNIL soldiers and the Punjab Regiment had defended Borneo. The civilian internees were mostly Dutch Roman Catholic priests, British civilians (including children), and British and Dutch Catholic nuns. There were a handful of Chinese and Eurasian civilian internees.

Each compound had its own "camp master" (or "camp mistress", in the case of the women's compound). The camp master was responsible for liaising between the internees and the Japanese authorities. Each compound contained a number of long barrack buildings, usually 25–30 m (82–98 ft), each of which housed 30–100 people. A barrack master was appointed for each building. The camp and barrack masters were appointed by Colonel Suga.

In addition, the Dutch other ranks and about 50 British soldiers were stationed in a separate compound at the Kampong Batu Tujoh airfield (also known as Bukit Stabah), near Kuching.

The camp included areas that had once been a rubber tree plantation, and some of the trees remained inside the compounds, providing a limited amount of shade.

== Compounds ==
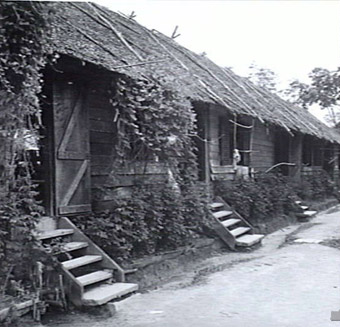
One of the barracks in the Australian officers' camp. This building housed about 60 officers.

Living conditions within the compounds were cramped. Each person was allotted a very small space within a barrack building within which to sleep, keep the few personal possessions they had with them, and also to eat, as there was no communal area within the barracks.

British officers and NCOs
This was described as "perhaps the most commodious" compound, with a fair amount of workable land. At first the officers were with the British other ranks, but they were separated out into this compound on 5 February 1943. Including the three huts, the compound was 2 1/2 acres (1.0 ha) in area with 1 1/2 acres (0.6 ha) of cultivable land. The Officer in Charge and overall British Military Authority was Lt.-Col. M. C. Russell, until his death on 5 June 1943; Lt.-Col T. C. Whimster took over the role thereafter. The compound held 134 men in September 1944.

Australian officers and NCOs
On liberation, 178 Australian officers and NCOs were held at Batu Lintang, in a compound which was without sufficient land for cultivation. The Officer in Charge was Lt.-Col. A. W. Walsh. The Australian other ranks were held in a camp at Sandakan.

Dutch officers and NCOs
This was without sufficient land for cultivation. The Officer in Charge was Lt.-Col. Mars.

British other ranks
British soldiers were "kept in grossly over-crowded barracks, with inadequate kitchen, lighting, water and sanitary services." They had no land for cultivation. Initially the compound held 1,500 POWs, with additional soldiers arriving thereafter taking the total to around 2,000, but by the end of the war the figure had been reduced to about 750. The Officer in Charge was RSM (later 2nd Lt) S. T. Sunderland.

British Indian Army other ranks
Soldiers from 2nd/15th Punjab Regiment were interned at Batu Lintang. The Indian POWs were housed in two huts, with no land for cultivation.

KNIL soldiers
Indonesian soldiers were housed in a small compound close to the British other ranks' compound.

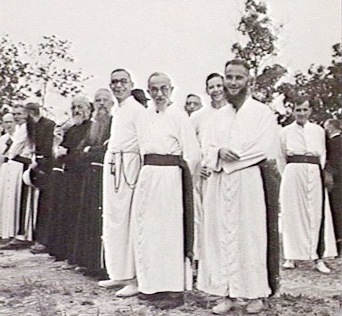
Priests waiting to welcome the liberating forces, 11 September 1945

Roman Catholic priests and religious men
The Catholic priests, brothers and religious men, mostly Dutch and Irish, lived in a separate compound, with a large plot of land to grow vegetables. They numbered 110, including 44 Capuchin friars, 5 Montfort missionaries, 22 Broeders van Huijbergen (Brothers of Huijbergen) and 38 Mill Hill Missionaries. At liberation, there were 395 civilian men, which included the priests.

Male civilian internees and some boys
In 1943, approximately 250 male civilian internees (excluding Roman Catholic Mission personnel) were held in this compound. From July 1942 until 14 November 1944 the camp master was C. D. Le Gros Clark (brother of Wilfrid Le Gros Clark), the former Chief Secretary, Sarawak Government; Lt.-Col. W. C. C. Adams (of the North Borneo Constabulary), who had been assistant camp master, then served in the role until liberation. Accounts mention a British civilian internee named Don Tuxford whose eight-year-old son was in the compound with him, while Tuxford's wife and daughter Julia were in the women's compound; other sources state that Dutch boys over the age of ten were sent to the men's compound rather than being placed with the women, as the Japanese considered them men at that age. The total number of male children held in the men's camp is uncertain.

Female civilian internees (including nuns) and children
This compound was located at the western part of the camp, slightly removed from the other compounds. The internees were mostly Dutch and British, with a few Eurasian and Chinese women, and four American women, including Agnes Newton Keith. Their quarters were described by an internee as "new and fair" and "they had a reason[able] area for cultivation." The camp mistress was initially Mother Bernardine, an English Roman Catholic nun, but when she became ill Mrs. Dorie Adams, wife of the master of the men's camp, took over the role. The women were housed in five very small barracks and each person was allotted a space of 6 feet by 4 feet (1.8m by 1.2m) in which to live and store their possessions. A chapel was constructed at one end of one of the huts.

In March 1944, the women's compound comprised 280 people: 160 nuns, 85 secular women and 34 children. By September 1944 the population had declined to 271; at liberation there were 237 women and children in the compound. Of the nuns, the large majority were Dutch Roman Catholic sisters, with a few English sisters. Initially there were 29 children in the compound, but by April 1943 there were 34. The oldest of these was seven when she entered the camp. None of the children died in the camp; the women often went without provisions to ensure the children's survival. A Roman Catholic priest from the nearby priests' compound came to the women's compound daily at 7 am to say mass, and the children were taught by the nuns.

== Daily life in the camp ==
Life in the camp is summed up by Keat Gin Ooi: "The trying conditions of life under internment at Batu Lintang camp tested to the limits of the human struggle for survival. Food shortages, diseases and sickness, death, forced labor, harsh treatment, and deplorable living quarters were daily occurrences in camp." The civilian internees were treated less harshly than the POWs; of those POWs, the other ranks were subjected to far worse treatment than the officers.

=== Work ===
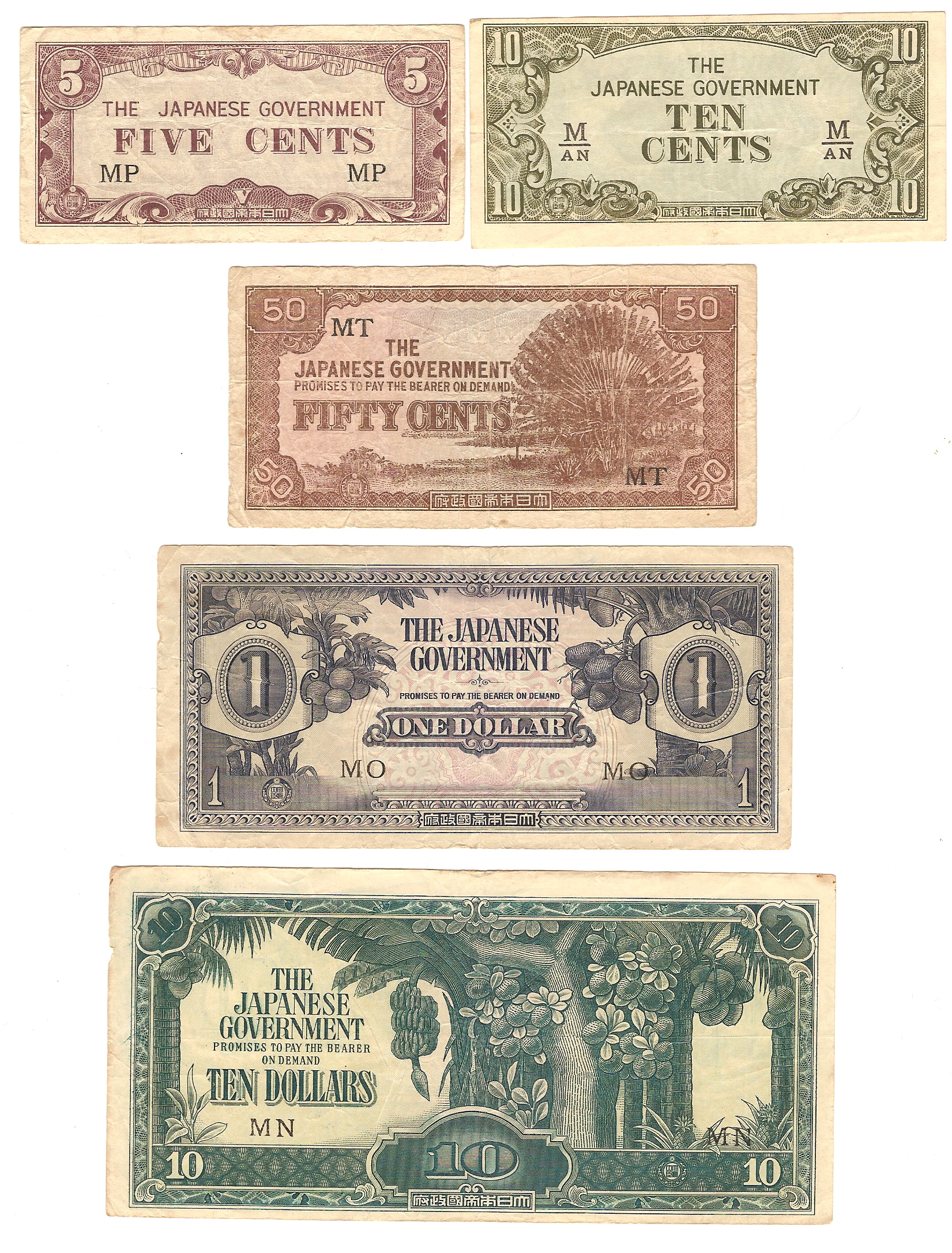
"Banana money", the currency introduced by the Japanese administration in the areas of Borneo that had previously been under British control. Denominations shown: 5 cents, 10 cents, 50 cents, 1 dollar, 10 dollars

The male civilian internees' regulations (prepared by the internees themselves) stated that "Any persons who are not performing some useful work in war-time are failing in their moral obligation. Internees should therefore do their best to do such work as ... agriculture, farming, and stock-breeding, in order to increase the supply of foodstuffs to the camp." Some male civilian internees chose to cultivate land around their compound in order to become self-supporting; however, the other work imposed on them meant that they never cultivated the land to its full effect. Some refused to carry out this work, even though it was for the common good. Work included wood-gathering parties, latrine duties, working as cookhouse staff and medical orderlies. Sundays were a rest day, but these were later cut to one in every three weeks.

POWs and male civilian internees were forced to work as stevedores and in timber yards at Kuching harbour on the Sarawak River and from October 1942, on the extension of the two runways at the Batu Tujoh landing ground to the south of Kuching, where a small sub-camp was constructed. Another sub-camp was made at Dahan, where the Japanese re-opened an old mercury mine, and used POWs to construct access roads. Such work was prohibited by the 1907 Hague Convention, to which Japan was a signatory. Although it was against international law to force the prisoners to work on projects with a military objective, they were informed that refusal to work on these projects would result in their execution. Other forced labour included refuelling the Zero fighters that used the runways; however, this happened only once as the men sabotaged the operation by adding urine and water to the fuel.

The work party men were paid in what the prisoners called "camp dollars", the printed paper currency introduced by the Japanese administration. This currency was known colloquially as "banana money" because of the banana trees pictured on the 10 dollar notes. At one point the rate was 25 cents a day for officers and NCOs and 10 cents a day for other ranks. As time went on, the working parties became smaller, as there was a lack of available men due to sickness and death.

The women were at first allowed to undertake domestic tasks around their compound; later they were forced to undertake work for the Japanese such as mending uniforms, for which they were also paid in camp dollars. In the later part of the war, when the food shortages had become critical, all internees, male and female, were also used as agricultural labourers on the land around the camp, to produce food for their Japanese captors. The prisoners referred to themselves as "white coolies".

Only 30 men were fit enough to attend the final work parties in 1945; the rest were either too ill, or already dead.

=== Food ===
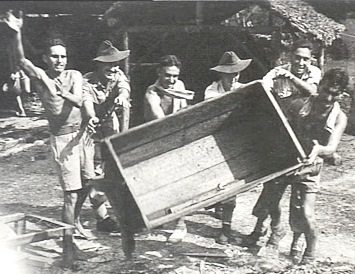
After liberation, ex-POWs throw away the pig trough in which the daily ration of boiled rice for 1200 men was served. The ration only half filled the trough, and was mixed with sweet potato tops.

Rations were always meagre but decreased in both quantity and quality as the war progressed. The women and children drew the same rations as the men. The Japanese controlled all food supplies, releasing only what was needed for the day. At the beginning, the rations comprised rice and local vegetables (such as kangkung), with every 10 days or so some pork (such as offal, or a head, or some poor-meat bearing part of the animal). The daily rice ration in late 1943 was 11 ounces (312 grams) a day; by the end of the war the rice ration was about 4 ounces (113 grams) per man daily. In September 1944, children were recorded as receiving 50 millilitres (1.8 imp fl oz; 1.7 US fl oz) of milk a day.

A black market emerged in which the main merchants were a Dutch-Indonesian couple, who obtained goods from a Japanese guard and sold them for a profit to those with cash or tradable goods.

At the times of greatest hardship the internees were so hungry that they were reduced to eating snakes, rubber nuts (which were believed to be poisonous), snails and frogs, and rats, cats and dogs if they could be caught. On special occasions an extra ration would be introduced. In the British POW compounds 58 chickens were provided for 1,000 men for Christmas 1942; the next Christmas the women received a single turkey to share between 271 women and children. At Christmas 1944, their last in captivity, the internees received a single egg each.

Only one Red Cross supply of parcels was received by the prisoners between March 1942 and September 1945. This arrived in March 1944 and worked out at one sixth of a parcel per person: a single tin of food. Prisoners occasionally were able to buy or barter chicks which they raised on worms and beetles and rice sweepings from the quartermaster's store floor (other edible food scraps being too precious to use). Those which were female provided much-needed eggs.

=== Health ===
A camp hospital was set up and run by a Japanese medical officer, Dr. Yamamoto. The prisoners believed that his policy was "live and let die", and the hospital became "a filthy germ-ridden death hole". Lionel E. Morris, a sapper with the British Army Royal Engineers, wrote that Yamamoto "never attended to ... sick or diseased men". Yamamoto issued an order that no rations were to be issued to men in the hospital. The prisoners pooled their food and the sick were provided for even though it meant all others went short. Care of all prisoners was left to the camp doctors, such as Colonel King and Captain Bailey in the POWs' compounds and Dr. Gibson in the women's compound.

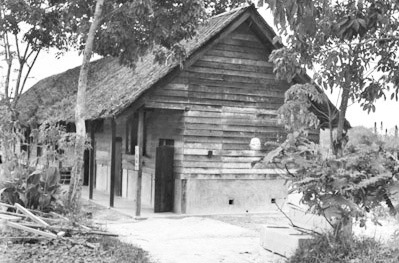
The camp hospital and mortuary. In the right foreground is a stack of coffins. These had hinged bottoms for re-use.

The hospital comprised three huts in January 1943 and housed both POWs and civilians. The standard of accommodation was very low and crowded, and facilities were virtually non-existent. A hut was later built for tuberculosis patients. In early September 1945 the camp hospital comprised about 30 beds under the care of Lt.-Col. E. M. Sheppard.

Little medicine was available to the internees from the Japanese: they provided small amounts of quinine and aspirins. Morris recounts how Yamamoto would quite often beat sick men until they fell down, especially if they approached him for drugs. Few Red Cross supplies were available and most medication was bought or bartered from the outside world or from the guards themselves. No anaesthesia was available for operations. The main source of medical supplies in early 1943 was a pro-Allied ethnic Chinese family who lived nearby and were assisting in the provision of materials for the construction of a radio.

==== Disease ====
The mortality rate amongst the British soldiers was extremely high: two-thirds of the population of POWs died in the camp. It was suggested that this high rate was partly because most had come direct from Europe and were not acclimatised and had no idea about the importance of tropical hygiene. Tropical ulcers—which are often diphtheria appearing as a secondary infection of a skin disease—were a common medical complaint, along with dysentery, malaria, beri-beri, dengue, scabies, and septic bites and sores. 600 men out of 1000 were unfit for work in January 1943 owing to beri beri and skin conditions. Deaths from dysentery increased towards the end of the period of captivity. A British NCO, E. R. Pepler, commented that "[m]en wasted away from their normal weight of over ten stone [140 lb/64 kg] to three or four stones [42–56 lb/19-25 kg] ... As the time passed on to 1945, the deaths in our camp [from dysentery] were taking place at two or three every day".

==== Malnutrition ====
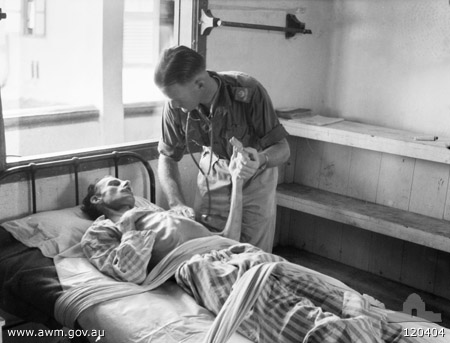
Captain Anderson, a severely emaciated British officer, in Kuching Civil Hospital five days after his liberation from Batu Lintang camp. With him is Major A. M. Hutson, an Australian medical officer.

Malnutrition caused most of the invalidity and was a major factor in the high mortality rate in the camp, ascribed as the chief cause of death in 600 deaths in the camp. It was considered by the relieving forces that the Japanese were pursuing a policy of deliberate starvation. The basic diet only contained 1.5 ounces (44 grams) of protein and had a calorific value of 1600. J. L. Noakes, a male civilian internee wrote:

"In common with many others I experienced the pain of food deficiency disease and by May 1944 it was difficult to work and nights were a torture. My eyes failed rapidly and it became impossible to read or to distinguish objects clearly. The death rate for the whole camp jumped at an alarming rate and we began to realise that we must now begin a real fight for existence."

By November 1944 the suffering caused by malnutrition was profound, as recorded by Hilda E. Bates, a female civilian internee who was a nurse based in Jesselton prior to the war:

"We are having a particularly hungry period and [I] can quite truthfully say that our mouths water, and that we 'slaver' as dogs do before meals. Some of us find it advisable to rise slowly after lying down, as due to malnutrition, any rapid movement is apt to cause dizziness or even a black-out ... one morning recently I awoke and discovered to my horror that my sight had become very dim. Later I realised this was due to vitamin deficiency in our poor diet."

By the end of their third year of internment, most women suffered from amenorrhoea due to malnutrition.

In May 1945 Hilda Bates met some of the male civilian internees at the funeral of a friend:

"I was horrified to see their condition. Some had formerly been strong men of twelve to fourteen stone [168–196 lb/76–89 kg] in weight, but were now reduced to mere shadows of themselves, and weighed less than eight stone [112 lb/51 kg]. .. [In] the soldiers camp ... many of the men were just skeletons,—crawling about, as few were able to stand upright. Even our toddlers received the same rations as these poor [souls], and the children are still hungry, so what must have been the suffering of those men, many of whom are hardly more than boys?"

On 30 August 1945, after Suga had officially informed the prisoners of the Japanese surrender but before the liberation of the camp, Hilda Bates visited the sick POWs:

"I was horrified to see the condition of some of the men. I was pretty well hardened to sickness, dirt and disease, but never had I seen anything like this in all my years of nursing. Pictures of hospitals during the Crimean War showed terrible conditions, but even those could not compare with the dreadful sights I met on this visit. Shells of men lay on the floor sunken-eyed and helpless; some were swollen with hunger, oedema and ber-beri, others in the last stages of dysentery, lay unconscious and dying. They had no pillows or clothes, few cups, fewer bowls, or even medical supplies. [...] There were three hundred desperately sick men, many unable to help themselves, or to carry food to their mouths. Throughout our internment, we women had begged to be allowed to nurse the soldiers, but the Japanese refused our offer, saying this would be indecent".

On his release, L. E. Morris, who was one of the "healthy" prisoners, weighed five stone, three pounds (73 lb (33 kg)).

==== Brutality ====
Brutality by the guards was another factor that damaged the health of many of the prisoners. Hilda Bates described the guards' treatment of the male prisoners: "Their favourite methods of punishment are either kicking below the waist with their heavy army boots, face slapping or striking the head with a rifle butt". Failure to bow properly to a guard was a common cause of a beating. Hilda Bates wrote of "One male internee [who] was paralysed for a week following Japanese brutality, simply because he had not made his bow in what the Japs considered a proper manner". E. R. Pepler recorded that "a favourite punishment was to make the offender stand in the blazing sun with his arms above his head holding a log of wood. If the prisoner or his arms sagged, he was punched or kicked. This treatment usually lasted until the prisoner completely collapsed".

Prisoners suspected of more serious misdemeanours were taken by the Japanese military police, the Kempeitai, for interrogation at the former Sarawak Police headquarters in Kuching. Torture was a common method of extracting information.

After the Japanese defeat, an Australian war crimes investigation team worked in Kuching from the liberation until January 1946. Of around 120 guards, more than 70 had a crime or crimes ascribed to them.

=== Clothing ===
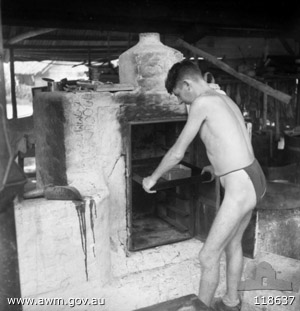
Private J. M. Curry, who was cook at the Australian Officers' camp, wearing the loincloth issued to him by the Japanese, his sole clothing issue in two years.

Clothing wore out quickly: the tropical climate meant that clothes had to be washed every day, and the rigours of labouring in them meant that they soon became torn, worn and threadbare. An enterprising male internee, J. R. Baxter, entered the camp with two pairs of shorts; as they wore out he constructed a new pair from them by glueing together the constituent parts with latex from the rubber trees growing in the camp. The Japanese did not provide replacement clothing for the prisoners when their clothes wore out. After a period male internees and POWs were issued with a loincloth and perishable rubber shoes, which soon degraded and meant in effect that most prisoners went barefoot. The women fared a little better, often bartering possessions for material: clothes were fashioned out of whatever material was to hand, such as sheets and breakfast cloths. Many of the women kept their best clothes unworn in readiness for their expected eventual liberation, while their other clothes became more and more shabby.

Prior to their liberation, supplies were dropped by the Australians. Hilda Bates recorded: "The soldiers received shorts, shoes, and blankets with instructions not to appear naked in future!".

=== Purchasing, bartering and smuggling ===
Prisoners were able to buy a small range of provisions from their captors at Japanese prices, which escalated as the war went on. Black marketeering was sometimes tolerated by the guards, as they themselves were involved in the buying or exchanging of goods, and at other times punished severely. Although contact with the outside world was forbidden, there were plenty of opportunities to communicate with the locals. Firewood-gathering gangs in the jungle were able to make contact and arrange purchases when the guards were not paying attention; at other times these transactions were permitted with the permission of and in the presence of a lenient Japanese guard. Gold, in the form of rings and jewellery, and British pounds were in demand by the Japanese guards. Such was the desperation of the prisoners towards the end of their internment that two soldiers disinterred a recently buried body in order to retrieve the dead man's wedding ring.

Smuggling became an integral part of camp life, and despite frequent searches, foodstuffs in particular were smuggled into the camp (for example, dried fish was nailed to the underside of wooden bins, and the inside of a hat was a favourite hiding place). Occasional dangerous night-time forays to outside the camp netted foodstuffs such as a chicken or eggs or fruit.

The Japanese currency (the "camp dollars") was used by the prisoners illicitly to purchase supplies from the locals.

=== Social life ===
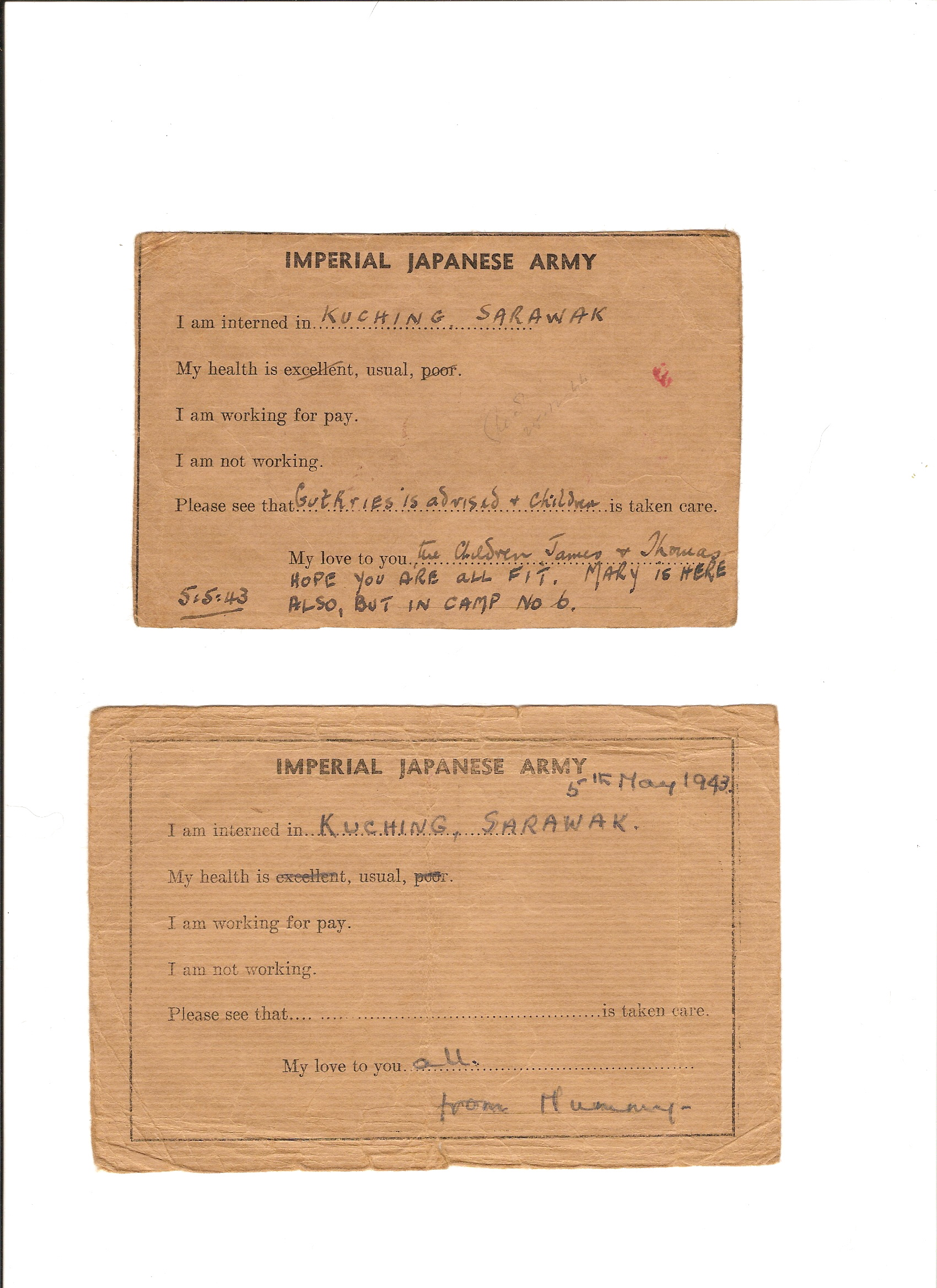
Postcards sent home to England by a civilian internee couple, 5 May 1943

Le Gros Clark, as men's camp master, issued regular official bulletins to his compound regarding meetings with Suga and other Japanese officers. Communication between the various compounds and with the outside world was forbidden. Married male internees were refused permission to see their wives and children on Christmas Day, 1943. Occasional, irregular meetings were allowed between married couples.

Pre-printed postcards to be sent home with stock phrases such as "I am well" and "We have plenty of food" were issued occasionally; Agnes Keith records that these were issued three times a year but in May 1945 it was decided that a certain percentage of the camp had to include a propaganda sentence in addition to the 25 permitted words of free text. She wrote:

"I decided that [the sentences] were all so obvious that my people would know they were propaganda. I sent the following card:

'Seven communications sent. Seven received. Health moderate. George [Keith's son] well, energetic, roughneck, reminds me my brother. Fed-up with war. Hopes deferred. Borneo is a beautiful place for living, a dreamland where the scenery is beautiful, little birds sing, very delicious fruits grow, we are very happy here. Agnes, Harry [Keith's husband], George.'

My aunt told me later that she had never felt as downhearted about my fate as when she received that card. She said that obviously I had lost my mind."

Sacks of undelivered mail both to and from the prisoners were discovered in the camp on liberation.

Working bees were held at Christmas time to make gifts for the children: worn-out clothing was cut up and sleeves, collars, and hems were cut from clothing still in use to provide materials for soft toys. More robust toys, such as scooters, carts, swords, and guns were made from materials such as barbed wire and the wood of rubber trees in and around the compounds. The nuns provided food and gifts for each child. The Japanese officers also gave sweets and biscuits to the children at Christmas. A concert was organised for Christmas 1942, as well as inter-compound games; another less lavish Christmas concert took place in 1943, and a concert party was briefly established before disbanding due to the illness and death of its members.

Lt. Frank "Tinker" Bell was largely responsible for conceiving and organising what became known by the prisoners as the "Kuching University". This operated in the British officers' compound. Under Japanese regulations prisoners were forbidden to teach, to learn, to compile or possess notes on any subject whatever, or to meet in groups for discussion. The penalty for disobedience was imprisonment or death. Despite this the university, led by Bell, established classes in seven modern languages, as well as subjects as diverse as history, public speaking, navigation, pig-farming, civics and poultry keeping. Bell and his fellow educators organised courses, compiled text books, led classes, and awarded diplomas. Classes were often held in the evenings when dusk or darkness gave some protection against surprise by their captors. Paper for writing exercises and for compiling textbooks was always at a premium: books were fashioned out of paper from soap wrappers, newspaper, the backs of letters and envelopes, and cigarette paper. These were bound into books and often covered with sarong material.

Other informal clubs, mainly comprising discussion groups, were established in the other compounds. They covered topics such as chess and draughts (checkers), book-keeping, sailing, and French conversation lessons. A central library for all the camp was run from the British Officers' compound, with books donated by the internees and some from the civilian library in Kuching town.

== Cemetery ==
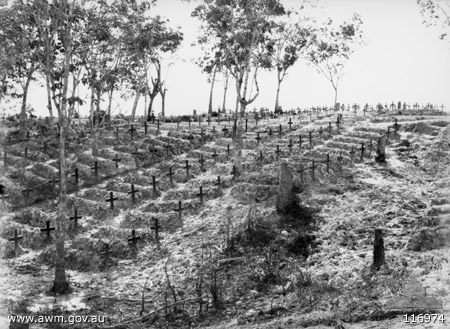
A section of the cemetery at Batu Lintang camp.

Initially the dead were buried in the cemetery at Kuching. The high death rate meant that this was soon filled, however, and in November 1942 a new cemetery area was created next to the camp at an area to the south-east known as "Boot Hill". The cemetery was within sight of the camp. At first the dead were buried in coffins, but soon the number of fatalities and the shortage of timber meant that shrouds made from rice sacks or blankets were used instead. The bodies were carried to the grave in a wooden coffin with a hinged bottom, which allowed re-use.

Hilda Bates wrote in June 1945: "I am horrified at the increased number of graves in the burial ground. Deaths are now so frequent, that a party of grave diggers is now permanently employed, and given extra rations in order that they will have the strength to dig".

After liberation the bodies were exhumed from the cemetery and sent to Labuan for reburial in a central military cemetery there. A large number of the graves of prisoners from Batu Lintang now at Labuan are unidentified: after the Japanese surrender Suga destroyed many camp records. The cemetery in Labuan is cared for by the Commonwealth War Graves Commission.

== The radio (the "Old Lady") and generator ("Ginnie") ==
Information on the outside world was gathered from a variety of sources, such as from co-workers of the Batu Lintang work parties at Kuching docks. An invaluable boost to the prisoners' morale was provided by a secret radio receiver, from which they were able to learn about the progress of the war. This had been constructed from scavenged and bartered parts. A generator was later constructed to power the radio.

The construction of the radio was ordered by Russell. He and some 1150 other POWs had arrived at Batu Lintang on 13 October 1942 from Tanjung Priok camp in Java, where a small group of men had worked on constructing a radio. His proposal was initially met with a distinct lack of enthusiasm, as discovery would result in certain death. One of these men was G. W. Pringle, a member of the British military police. He wrote "Do these madmen ever seriously consider these idiotic plans before putting men's lives in danger?"

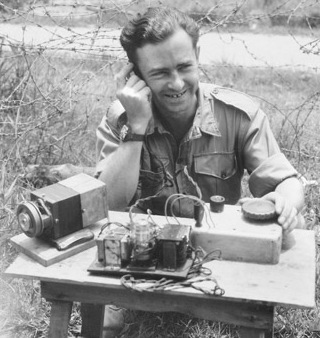
Leonard Beckett with the radio (the "Old Lady") and the generator ("Ginnie")

It was known that ethnic Chinese people in Sarawak were pro-Allied, and so contact was made with the Ongs, the leading Chinese family in Kuching, who lived about a mile from the camp, to see if they could assist in providing parts. The first night-time attempt, by G. W. Pringle, was a failure as he could not find his way through the dense jungle to the house. A reconnoitre mission was required. To achieve this, Russell suggested to Dr Yamamoto that as the area was a breeding ground for mosquitoes (with the resultant risk of malaria, which would affect Japanese and prisoner alike), the jungle should be cleared and sprayed. Pringle took part on this working party and was able to plot his route. He subsequently made contact and Ong Tiang Swee, Kapitan China of Sarawak and the patriarch of the Ong family, agreed to help. Ong instructed his grandson, Kee Hui to help Pringle obtain the needed parts. This was at massive risk to the family's own safety as they too would have been executed if discovered. Their only condition was that they should be provided with the news gathered from the radio, in order to boost the morale of the Chinese community under occupation in Kuching. They provided some radio parts, the acquisition of which must have been a considerable task as all radio equipment had been confiscated by the Japanese.

The radio was built and operated in the British other ranks' compound. The maker of the radio was Warrant Officer Leonard A. T. Beckett, an experienced radio engineer, who was assisted in its construction, operation, and concealment by a core group of three other soldiers. Before Beckett could begin on the radio he first had to make some of the tools needed, such as a lathe and a soldering iron. In addition to the genuine radio parts provided by the Chinese family and a few parts brought along with the men from Tanjung Priok, the radio was constructed from items as diverse as a deaf aid, the steering damper of a Norton motorcycle, a bakelite shaving soap container, an army mess tin, the backing of an old map case, pieces of glass, wire, mica and barbed wire, and parts stolen from Japanese-owned motor cars and motorcycles. The receiver was completed within four weeks of starting.

The radio was concealed during its construction in a large stewing-pot; once completed its hiding place was in a biscuit tin buried under the bakehouse fire in the British other ranks' compound. It was operated in the stores where it had a temporary hiding place in a false-bottomed table. Elaborate security proceedings to protect the radio were put in place, including a network of look-outs.

The radio at first ran off torch batteries: these soon ran out and so Beckett constructed a power unit to run off the camp electricity supply. Access to the camp powerhouse was gained by one of the POWs who had been a professional cat burglar before the war.

The radio was first used on the night of 24 February 1943, as radio reception was better in the evening. Some of the news was bewildering to the prisoners: "Who is this General Montgomery? He seems to be the man we ought to have had in charge from the very beginning. A real live wire", wrote Pringle.

The existence of the radio, referred to by many code-names but chiefly as the "Old Lady" and "Mrs Harris", was to be a closely guarded secret, for fear of alerting the Japanese to its existence through loose talk. The commanding officers of the camp and those who had constructed and operated it were known as the "Board of Directors", and were the only ones who knew the precise contents of the radio news received. A way of disseminating information was organised: it was arranged for rumours to be spread which contained a considerable amount of truth. Le Gros Clark, the head of the male internees, directed the dissemination of news amongst the male internees; it was decided not to provide information to the women's compound. News was also passed to the Chinese once a week, carried through the jungle by Pringle. On the first exchange, without being asked, the Chinese thoughtfully provided medical supplies; thereafter they regularly provided much-needed medicines, money, and vegetable seeds. The leaked news rumours had the desired effect and a more cheerful atmosphere was noted in the camp. The women's compound somehow learned of the existence of the radio and the camp mistress, Dorie Adams, asked that they should be provided with news; to counter worries about security she suggested that the Roman Catholic priest who celebrated mass with the R.C. nuns should deliver the news as part of his service, which was always given in Latin.

In early March 1943 the provision of electric power for the lighting in the internees' compounds was halted. This was a serious blow as the radio was run off the power supply. Batteries were unavailable and so the only solution, again the idea of Russell, was to construct a generator. His idea again met with some initial scepticism: "Now I know he has gone mad", wrote Pringle. Pringle's colleagues were more enthusiastic. Beckett was sure he could build the generator and British RAOC personnel were certain they could supply the necessary components, though they thought it would take three months to make the tools needed. To disguise the noise of the work the enterprise was described as a "watch repairing factory" to the Japanese, who offered the use of various tools and other equipment. In March 1943, after the execution of some prisoners at the Sandakan POW camp for operating a radio, the Japanese stepped up their searches at Batu Lintang. Many items essential for the construction of the generator such as magnets, wire, and scrap iron were not easily available, but the involvement of "Freddie", one of the prisoners who was a self-confessed thief (and most likely the same man who had previously obtained a power supply: records are unclear) meant that material and equipment was soon obtained.

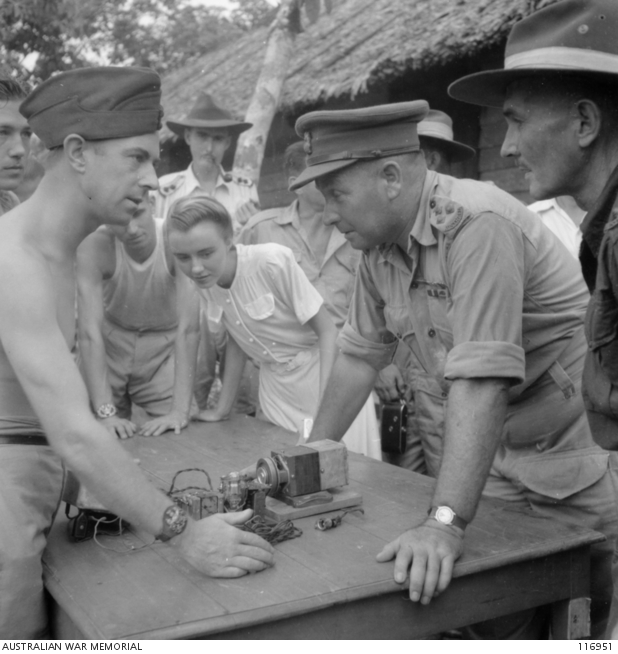
Leonard Beckett showing the radio to Brigadier T. C. Eastick and A. W. Walsh on 11 September 1945

The generator needed to turn at 3,000 revolutions a minute, and so the fittest of the men involved in its construction was chosen to turn the wheel. He was given extra food rations to prepare him for the task. The first trial of the generator was a success, and again, Pringle recorded how news reports told of unknown figures: "Events appeared to have been moving with unseemly haste during our enforced breaks from the news broadcasts. [We] listened to names we had never heard of. General Eisenhower? General Stilwell?" The assembling and disassembling drill took less than thirty seconds, with both the "Old Lady" and "Ginnie" stowed in their hiding places in the hut which was occupied by cookhouse staff during the day.

In June 1944, Le Gros Clark was taken from the camp by the kempeitai for questioning. On his return the same day, he was considerably shaken and recommended that the radio should be destroyed. This message was relayed to the camp master of the British other ranks' compound by Whimster, who was the senior British officer. Beckett and his colleagues were informed of this order, but were left to decide themselves what course of action to take. Realising its importance in keeping up camp morale, they decided to keep the radio, saying that "we might as well be hung for a sheep as a lamb", according to Pepler. Steps to safeguard the civilian internees were undertaken by cutting off news to their compounds.

That same month the prisoners received news of the invasion of Normandy. Pringle recorded how, once again, the news brought unfamiliar names to the prisoners' attention: "'Blood and Guts Patton'. Now there is a name for a General! ... Somehow though, we feel that with a General bearing the name of 'Blood and Guts' there is little danger of the Germans dislodging his army". It was clear that such important news would have a great effect in the camp; at the same time, the rejoicing it would bring would undoubtedly alert the Japanese. It was therefore decided to provide a hint to the other prisoners, rather than the full information. This was again delivered by a priest, this time by the priest officiating at one of the numerous funeral services. He quoted Exodus chapter 15, verses 9 and 10, which refer to pursuing, overtaking and destroying the enemy, and the sea. News of the bombing of London by V-2 rockets was withheld.

The news of the German capitulation on 7 May 1945 was similarly cryptically relayed at a funeral by the priest. This time the verse was Exodus chapter 3, verse 8, concerning the deliverance of the Israelites from the Egyptians to the land of milk and honey; extra piquancy was added by the fact that Suga was present at this service.

== End of the war for Batu Lintang ==
In the Allied plans for the South West Pacific theatre, the responsibility for re-taking the island of Borneo was entrusted to Australian forces. Prior to the Australian landings, strategic bombing and reconnaissance missions were undertaken by the RAAF and USAAF. The first Allied planes, 15 USAAF Lockheed Lightnings, were seen over the camp on the morning of 25 March 1945, as they flew on a mission to bomb the Batu Tujoh landing ground. Raids continued sporadically over the next few weeks. A lone Flying Fortress regularly attacked targets in Kuching.

The Borneo campaign was launched on 1 May 1945, with a brigade of the Australian 9th Division landing at Tarakan, on the eastern coast of Dutch Borneo. The American armed forces provided naval and air support to assist the landings, and in some cases the Australians were assisted by the advance landings of the Services Reconnaissance Department (SRD) and their local allies. This was followed by landings in Brunei and Labuan on 10 June. In early July, a raid was made by Mosquito aircraft on oil and petrol dumps near to the camp. Liberation still seemed a remote prospect, however: "As the weeks dragged by, the lone planes of the Allies were a daily occurrence and as we had realised very early that they could do nothing to help us, we hardly took any notice of them".

The atomic bombings in Japan at Hiroshima on 6 August 1945 followed by that of Nagasaki on 9 August precipitated the abrupt end of the war. On 15 August 1945, Japan announced its official unconditional surrender to the Allied Powers. The POWs learned of the surrender early in the morning of 15 August, in a broadcast by Radio Chungking received by the secret radio. Pringle made one last journey through the jungle to inform his Chinese friends. The news was immediately broken to the British other ranks' compound, and quickly spread to the other compounds. Celebratory meals were prepared, with precious supplies and livestock used up. The Japanese guards were unaware of their country's surrender, and as the day coincided with an official camp holiday, marking the opening of the camp on 15 August three years previously, they were satisfied that the celebrations were related to the break from the working parties. The women learned shortly afterwards, when the married women had their scheduled meeting with their husbands.

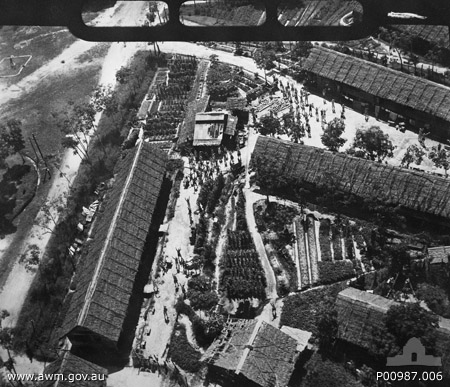
Prisoners waving to the RAAF Beaufighter aircraft which flew over to drop leaflets announcing Japan's surrender

Under General Order No. 1, issued on 16 August by General Douglas MacArthur, as Supreme Commander of the Allied Powers, the Japanese were required to provide information on the location of all camps and were responsible for the safety of prisoners and internees, for providing them with adequate food, shelter, clothes and medical care until their care could pass to the Allied powers, and for handing over each store together with its equipment, stores, arms and ammunition and records to the senior Allied officer in each camp. Since it was known that in many areas prisoners and internees were suffering from starvation and neglect, it was of the first importance that they were contacted and recovered as soon as possible.

Despite the surrender, the Japanese would remain in control of the camp until 11 September. During this period, there were no work parties and the prisoners did not suffer any beatings. "It became apparent during the next few days that the Japanese soldiers knew something had happened but were not sure what it was", wrote Pepler. Extra food was provided by the Japanese shortly afterwards; the camp hospital was furnished with bed chairs and mosquito nets for the first time, and substantial amounts of medicine were issued.

A pamphlet in English titled JAPAN HAS SURRENDERED was dropped over the camp by three Beaufighters on 16 August. From 19–23 August, leaflets were dropped by aircraft all over known areas in which the Japanese were concentrated, giving general war news and news of the progress of the surrender. On August 19 or 20, more leaflets were dropped on the camp. Signed by Major-General George Wootten, General Officer Commanding, 9th Division, they informed the prisoners of the surrender of Japan, and stated "I know that you will realise that on account of your location, it will be difficult to get aid to you immediately, but you can rest assured that we will do everything within our power to release and care for you as soon as possible".

On 24 August, Suga officially announced to the camp that Japan had surrendered. On 29 August letters were dropped on the camp, instructing the Japanese commander to make contact with the Australian commanders. The letter contained a code of panel signals which enabled Suga to indicate that he agreed to the dropping of supplies for the prisoners and that he would meet Australian representatives later. These panels were placed on the roof of one of the buildings and can be seen in the photograph at the start of the article (above).

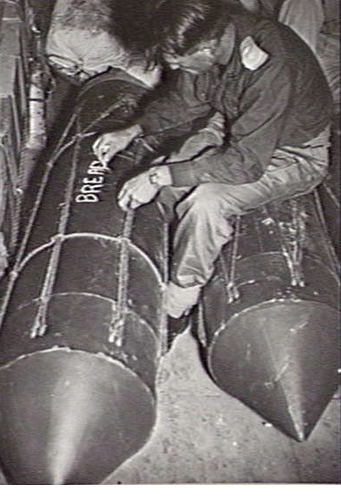
Preparing to drop a "storpedo" into the camp, 30 August 1945. "On the six foot torpedo was printed the word BREAD ... [it] spelled BREAD, but it meant, YOU ARE NOT FORGOTTEN" Agnes Newton Keith, Three Came Home.

Stores in long canisters (known by the aircraftmen as "storpedos") were first parachuted into the camp from a RAAF Douglas Dakota on 30 August. A female internee, Hilda Bates, wrote: "At 11.30 a.m. today a sea-plane dropped twenty parachutes with packages attached. One fell outside our hut and was labelled 'bread'. Others contained flour, tinned rabbit, and other meat. The goods were collected by the Japs under the supervision of Australian Officers who distributed them to the groups of internees. All sorts of what we had thought of as luxuries arrived; such as sugar, sweets, milk, bundles of clothing, and even fashion books!". Further supplies were dropped daily; tragedy struck on 7 September when a male civilian internee was hit and killed by a storpedo that had broken free from its parachute.

The official Instrument of Surrender was signed on 2 September ending World War II.

After communicating with the Japanese staff at Kuching, Colonel A. G. Wilson landed on the Sarawak River on 5 September and conferred with the commander of the Japanese forces there, who confirmed there were 2,024 Allied prisoners and internees in the area. The next day, Brigadier Thomas Eastick, commander of Kuching Force—a detachment from the 9th Division—flew to the mouth of the Sarawak River in a Catalina where three Japanese officers, including Suga, came aboard for talks. The task of Kuching Force was to accept the surrender of and impound the Japanese forces in the Kuching area, release and evacuate Allied prisoners and internees, and establish military control. At the meeting, Suga presented Eastick with complete nominal rolls of all compounds in the camp.

On 7 September, Walsh was permitted by the Japanese to fly to the headquarters of the 9th Division on Labuan island, to collect surgical and medical supplies for the camp. He returned with two Australian medical officers, Major A. W. M. Hutson and Lt.-Col. N. H. Morgan. Pepler recorded how "Dr Yamamoto came in for one hell of a time from these two Medical Officers when they saw the state of the majority of our camp. Up-to-date medical care and drugs soon began to show effect upon our sick and many lives were saved by these two officers. Out of the two thousand of us who entered that camp, only seven hundred and fifty survived and of these well over six hundred were chronic sick".

=== Death orders ===
Immediately prior to the surrender of Japan, rumours abounded in the camp that the Japanese intended to execute all the prisoners rather than allow them to be freed by the approaching Allied forces; when Dr Yamamoto informed some prisoners that they were to be moved to a new camp they naturally feared the worst, especially when he promised the unlikely idyll of a camp "equipped with the best medical equipment obtainable ... there would be no working parties and food would be plentiful ... the sick men would be especially well cared for".

Official orders to execute all the prisoners, both POWs and civilian, on 17 or 18 August 1945 were found in Suga's quarters after the liberation of the camp. The orders were not carried out, presumably as a result of the unconditional surrender of Japan on 15 August. A "death march", similar to those at Sandakan and elsewhere, was to have been undertaken by those male prisoners physically able to undertake it; other prisoners were to be executed by various methods in the camp:

- 1 All POWs and male internees to be marched to a camp at milestone 21 and bayoneted there
- 2 All sick unable to walk to be treated similarly in the Square at Kuching [in the square at the camp rather than in Kuching town]
- 3 All women and children to be burnt in their barracks

Revised orders for the execution on 15 September 1945 of all the internees were also found, this time in the Administration Office at Batu Lintang:

- Group 1 Women internees, children and nuns – to be given poisoned rice
- Group 2 Internee men and Catholic Fathers to be shot and burnt
- Group 3 POWs to be marched into the jungle, shot and burnt
- Group 4 Sick and weak left at Batu Lintang main camp to be bayoneted and the entire camp to be destroyed by fire

The camp was liberated on 11 September 1945, four days before the revised proposed execution date of over 2,000 men, women and children.

== Liberation of the camp ==
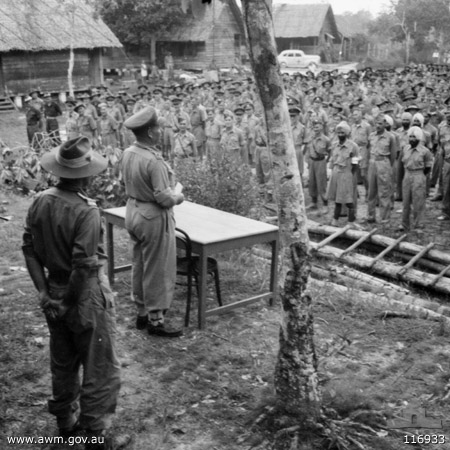
Eastick addressing part of the parade at the surrender ceremony at the camp, 11 September 1945

On 8–9 September, the Royal Australian Navy corvette HMAS Kapunda, with Eastick and staff officers on board, sailed for Kuching, along with USS Doyle C. Barnes. At 14:35 on 11 September, Eastick accepted the surrender of the Japanese forces in the Kuching area from their commander, Major-General Hiyoe Yamamura, on board HMAS Kapunda. Later that day the Australian occupying force landed.

The 9th Division troops arrived at Batu Lintang camp that afternoon, accompanied by a few American naval officers. There was no resistance from the Japanese troops. The prisoners and internees had been forewarned that there would be no delay in taking the surrender, and quickly gathered at 17:00 in the main square of the camp to witness Eastick accept the sword of Suga. The Japanese finally learned of the existence of the radio in a dramatic fashion:

"The Australian Commander, Major General [sic] Eastick ... mounted the rostrum and after accepting the sword of surrender from Suga was about to dismiss him when a shout, rising simultaneously from the throats of the Board of Directors of the 'Old Lady' and 'Ginnie' stopped the proceedings. 'Hold on, we have something to show you.' Carrying the radio and generator Len [Beckett] proudly showed them to the General and turning to Suga, asked, 'Well, what do you think about it Suga?' Now I know the full meaning of the saying 'If looks could kill.' Len would have died a horrible death".

The following day, Suga, together with Captain Nagata and Dr Yamamoto, were flown to the Australian base on Labuan, to await their trials as war criminals. Suga committed suicide there on 16 September. Nagata and Yamamoto were later tried, found guilty and executed.

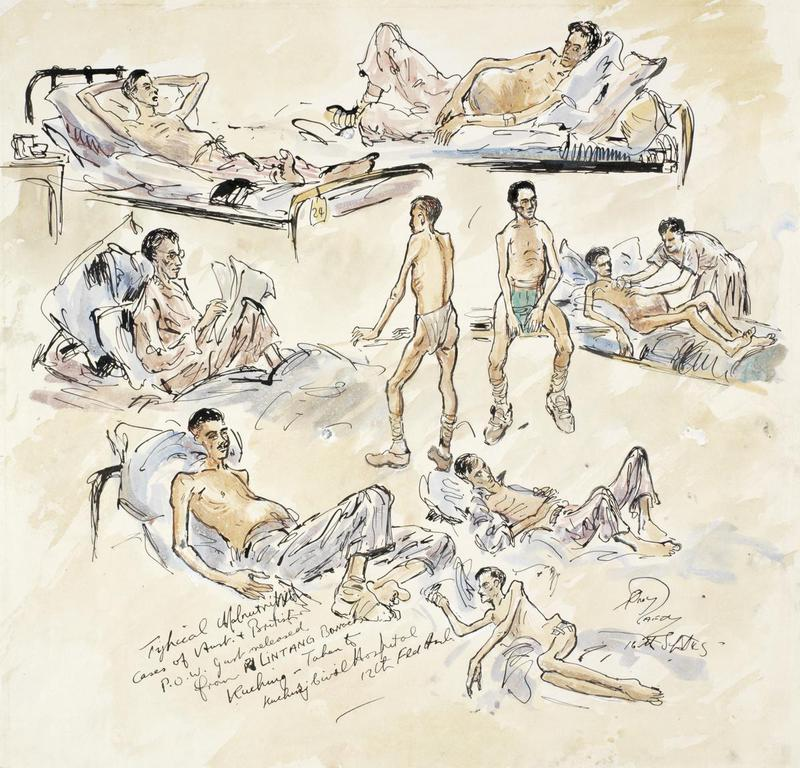
British and Australian prisoners of war after being rescued from Batu Lintang camp, by Tony Rafty

Photographers and cameramen accompanied the liberating force, and the events, and those of the following days, were well-documented. On liberation, the camp contained 2,024 inmates: 1,392 prisoners (including 882 British, 178 Australian and 45 Indian); and 632 internees. The most ill prisoners were taken to Kuching Civil Hospital, which had been entirely refitted by the Australians since serving as the Japanese military hospital.

On 12 September, a thanksgiving service was held in the camp, led by two Australian chaplains from the liberating force and Bishop Francis S. Hollis of Sarawak, an ex-internee. This was followed by a parade held in honour of Wootten, as commander of the 9th Division. In appreciation of Beckett's work on the radio, fellow ex-prisoners in the camp subscribed over £1,000 for him, a massive sum of money for the time, which Beckett intended to use to set up a wireless business in London, his hometown. Beckett was later awarded the British Empire Medal for his work on the radio.

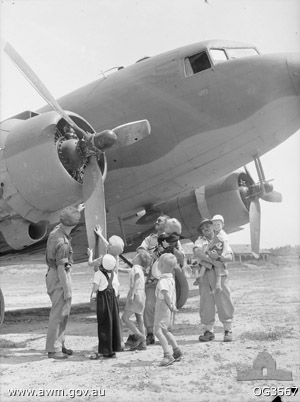
Ex-internee children inspecting the RAAF Douglas Dakota C-47 on which they were to be transferred to Labuan.

Repatriation commenced on 12 September, and by 14 September, 858 former prisoners had been removed, though pressure of numbers meant that some were still at Batu Lintang a week after liberation. Ex-prisoners were transported by ship (including Wanganella, an Australian hospital ship) and in eight Douglas Dakotas and two Catalinas, to the 9th Division's "Released Prisoners of War and Internees Reception Camp", and the 2/1st Australian Casualty Clearing Station (CCS) on Labuan, before continuing their journeys homeward.

The captured Japanese soldiers were then held at Batu Lintang camp. There they were visited by J. B. Archer, an ex-internee, who noted "There were about eight thousand of them ... it was difficult not to feel aggrieved at the good treatment they were receiving compared to what we had received at their hands. A lunch of fried rice, fish, vegetable and dried fruit was shown to me. This, I was told, was just an ordinary sample."

== Post-war ==
By June–July 1946, the bodies in the cemetery at Batu Lintang had been exhumed and reburied in the military cemetery on Labuan island. In 1947, a grant was approved for the establishment of a teachers' training college on the site. It exists as such to the present day, the oldest in Malaysia. Of the numerous huts that had housed the prisoners, only 21 were considered fit for use in 1947; after refurbishment the college moved in July 1948 from its temporary home in Kuching to the site at Batu Lintang. The huts have gradually been replaced over the years, although a few remnants of the site's former life remain. These include a single hut (albeit with a galvanised roof rather than the attap (palm leaf) one of the war), the old gate posts, the gate bunker and stump of the Japanese flag pole. There is also a small museum on the site.

Three Came Home, an account of female internee Agnes Newton Keith's time in the camp, was published in 1947. It was later made into a feature film of the same name, with Claudette Colbert playing the part of Agnes, Patric Knowles playing her husband Harry and Sessue Hayakawa in the role of Suga.

The Union Jack which had been draped over the coffins of prisoners of war at the camp, and which had been raised in the camp on the Japanese capitulation, was placed in All Saints Church, Oxford in April 1946, together with two wooden memorial plaques. After the deconsecration of the church and their temporary loss, in 1993 the flag and plaques were housed in Dorchester Abbey.

The Australian War Memorial in Canberra, Australia holds a large archive of material related to the camp, much of which is accessible on the AWM website in the collections databases. In England, the Imperial War Museum in London also houses material about the camp, as does the Bodleian Library of Commonwealth and African Studies at Rhodes House in Oxford. Many of the personal recollections held at the latter two repositories are reproduced in the 1998 publication by Keat Gin Ooi (see below for full reference).

Originally the site was commemorated by a small stone. A more formal memorial was opened at the site of the camp in April 2013. Various memorial ceremonies have been held at the site of the camp, including one on 11 September 2020 to mark the 75th anniversary of the liberation of the camp.

=== Batu Lintang in March 2007: gallery ===
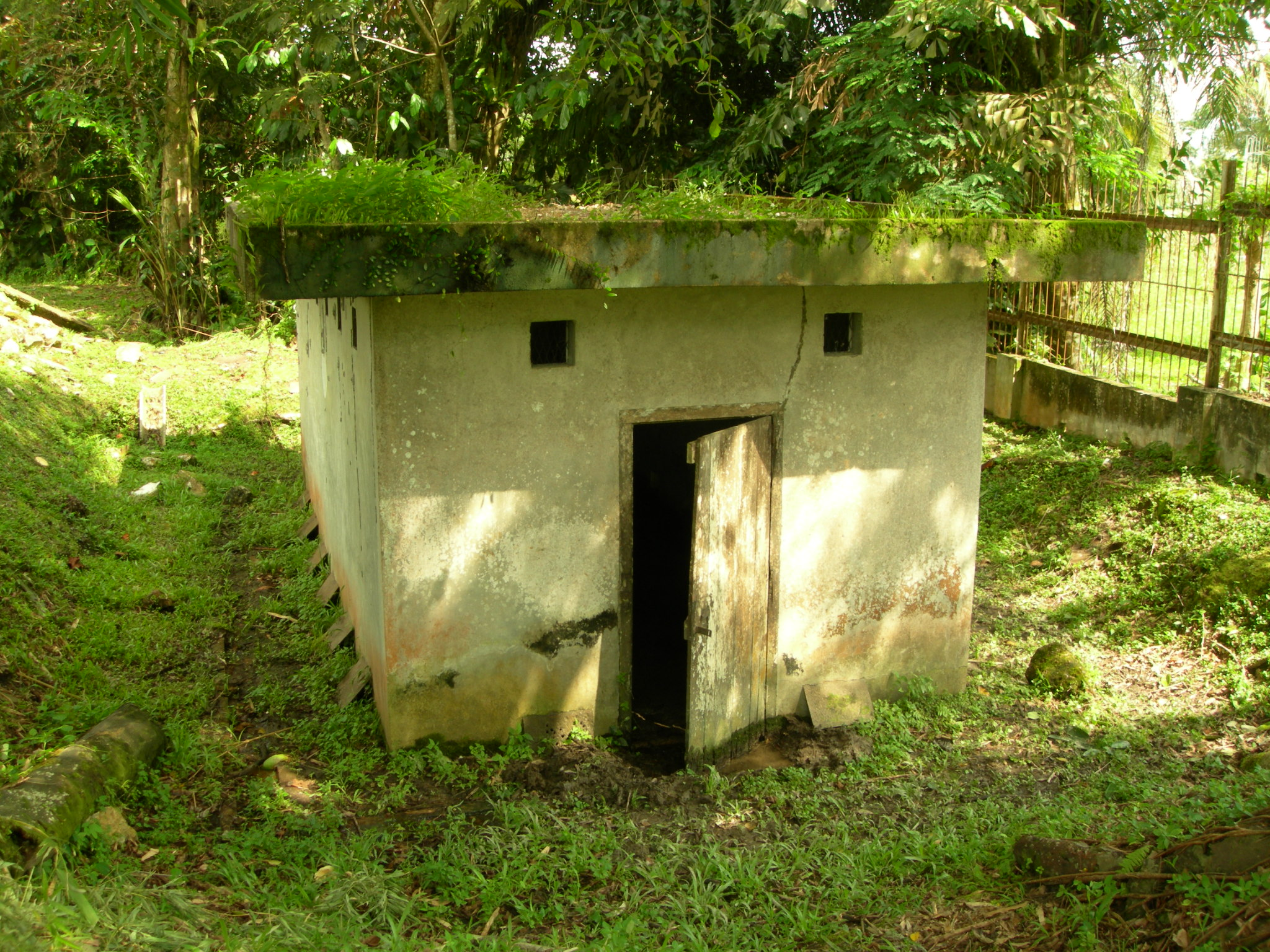
Ammunition bunker.

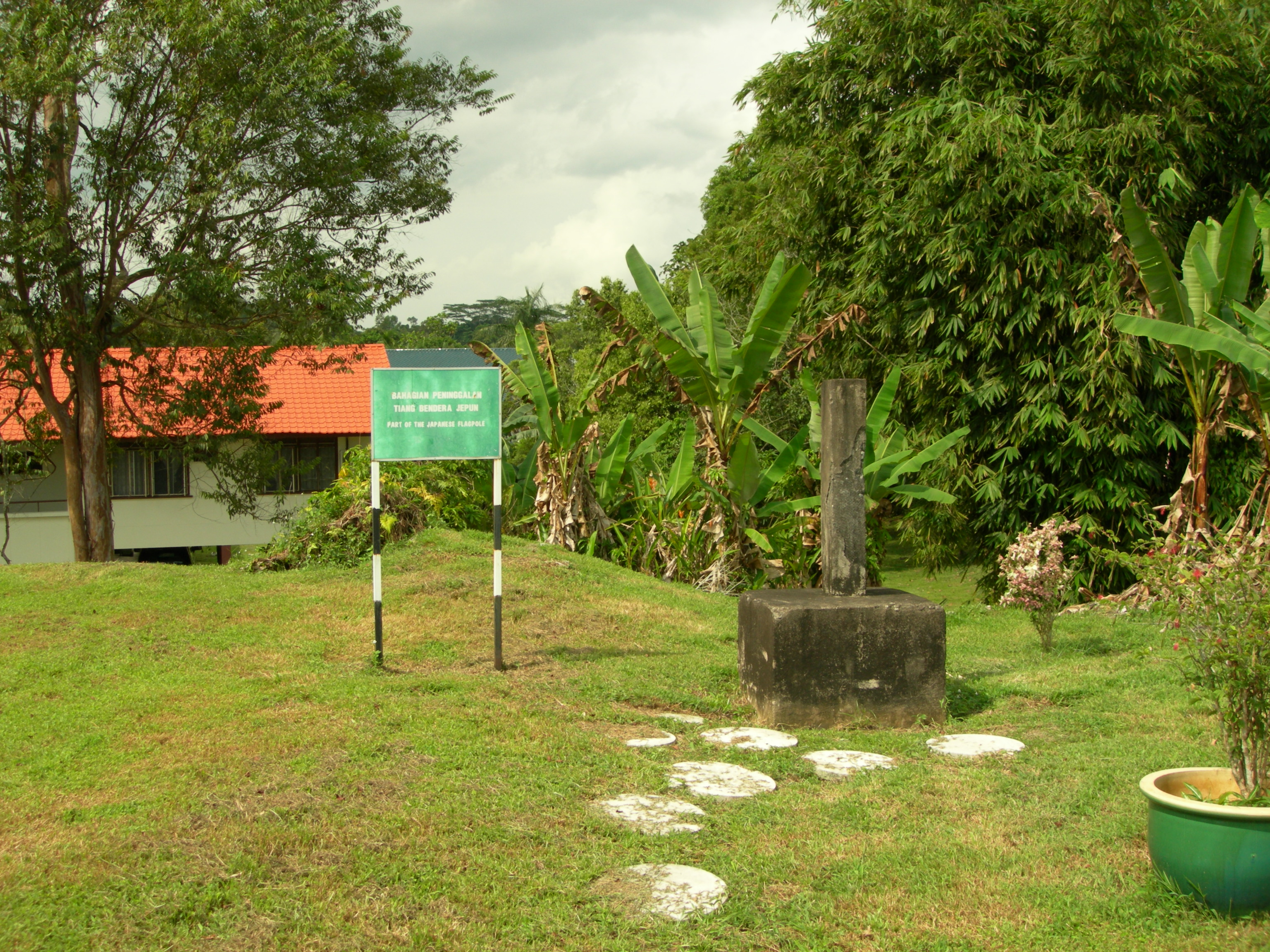
Remains of the Japanese flagpole at the site of Lt.-Col. Suga's office.

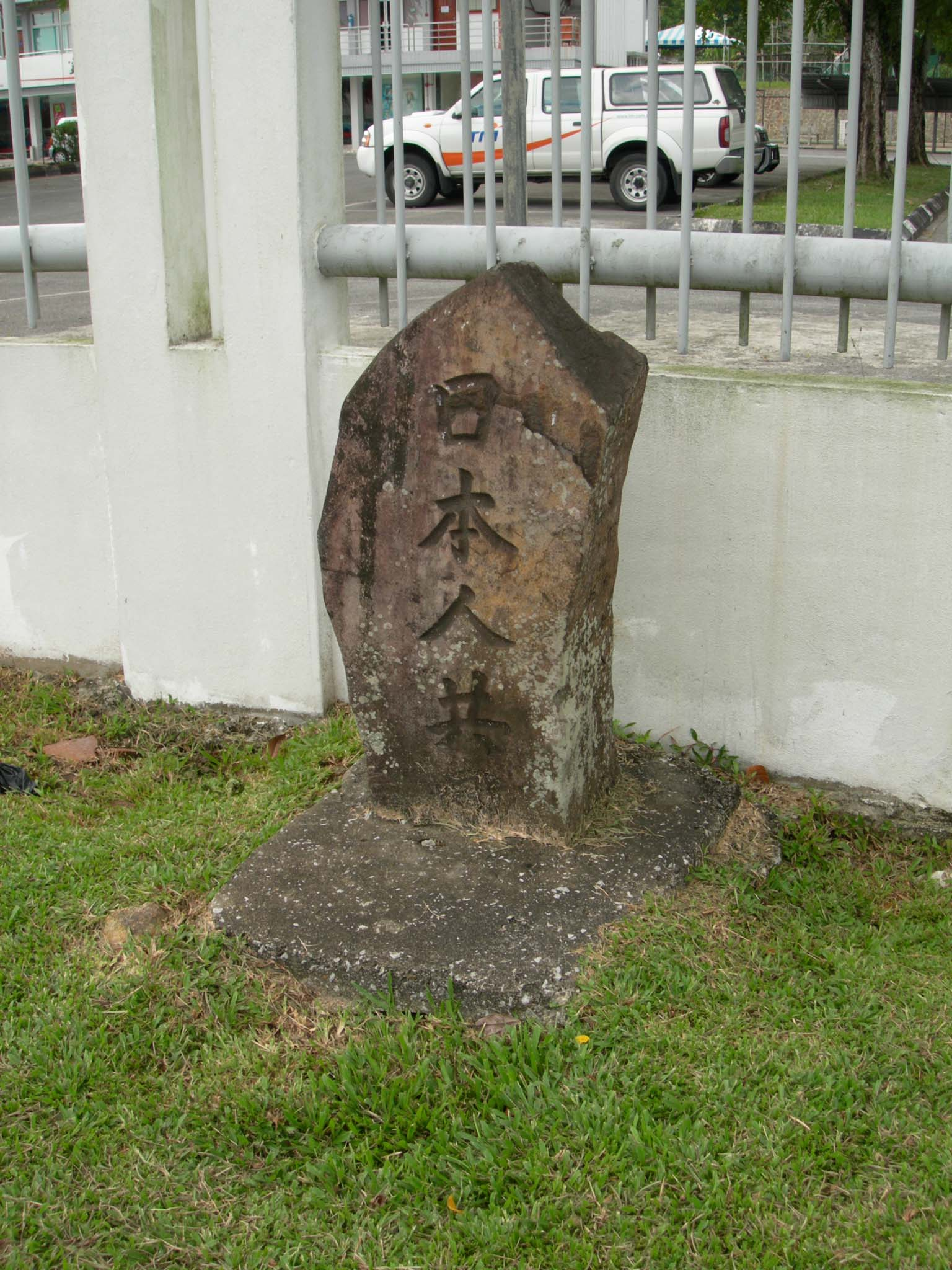
Japanese monument at the main road leading to the camp.

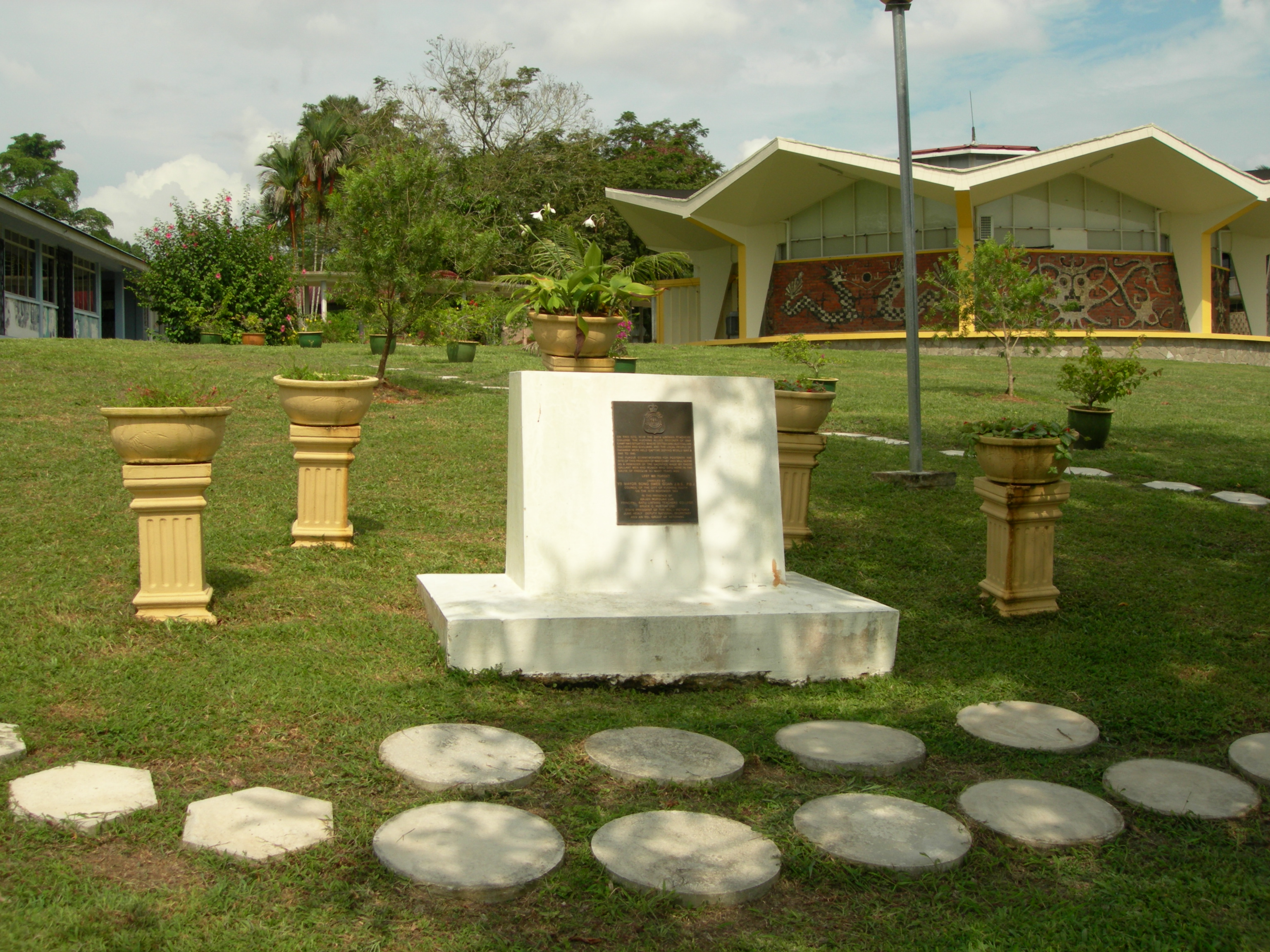
Prisoner of War camp memorial.

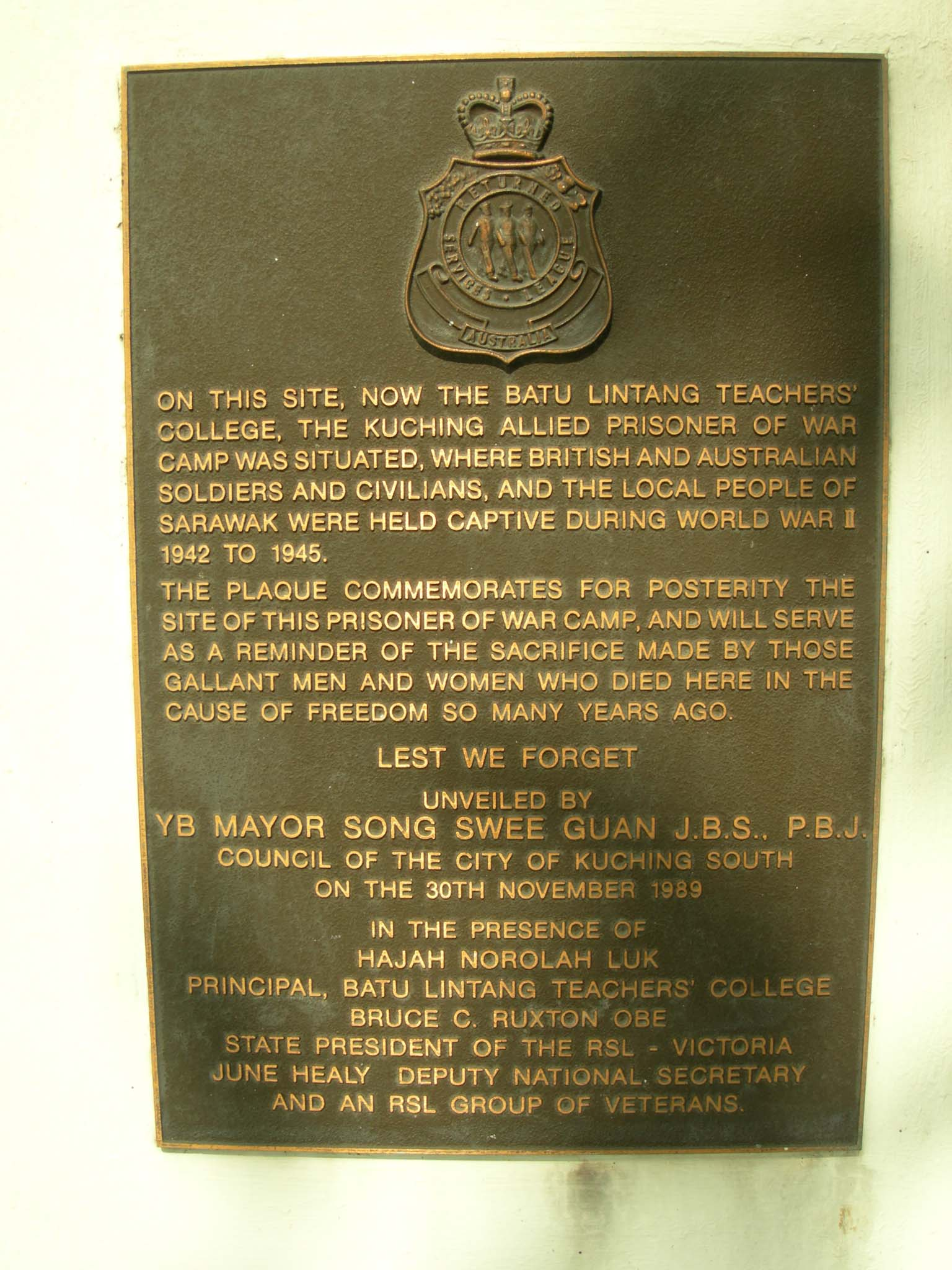
Plaque of the Prisoner of War camp memorial.

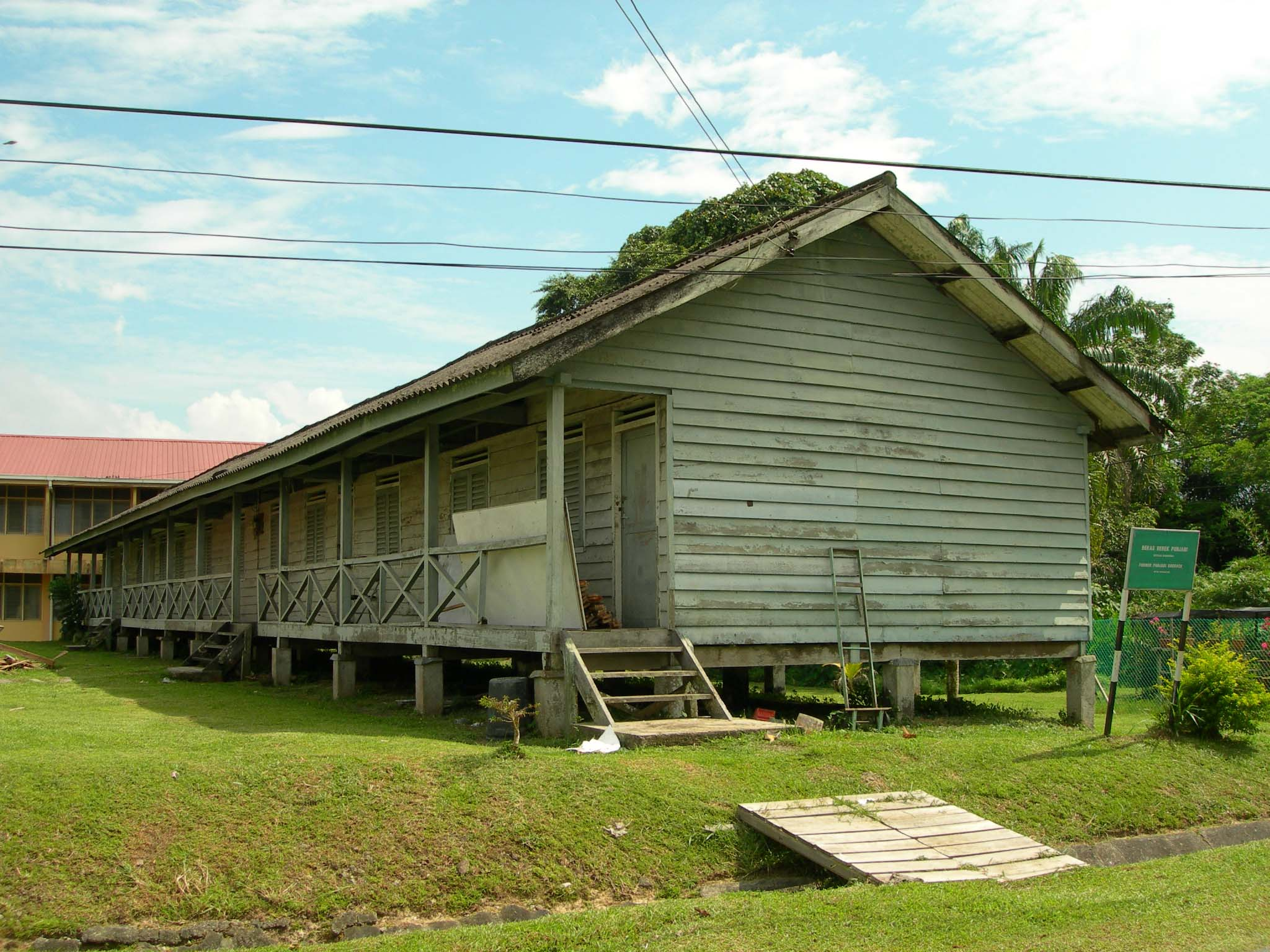
'Punjabi Barracks', a reconstructed building. Currently the oldest building in the camp grounds.

== POWs and internees of note ==
- Edward Banks, naturalist and museum curator (internee)
- Frank Bell, educator (POW)
- Dr Marcus C. Clarke (internee)
- Philip Crosland, journalist (POW)
- Kenelm Hubert Digby, proposer of the notorious 1933 "King and Country" debate and later Attorney General and judge in Sarawak (internee)
- I. H. N. Evans, anthropologist, ethnographer and archaeologist (internee)
- Ranald Graham, writer, director and producer (child internee)
- Francis Hollis, Anglican Bishop of Labuan and Sarawak (internee)
- Agnes Newton Keith, author (internee)
- Harry Keith, forester and plant collector (internee)
- Cyril Drummond Le Gros Clark, Secretary of Sarawak, and translator of Su Shi from Chinese into English (internee)
- Michael P. O'Connor, doctor, writer and broadcaster (internee)
- Alan Rice-Oxley, World War I flying ace (internee)
- Charles Robert Smith, Governor of North Borneo (internee)
- Keith Wookey, colonial administrator (internee)
- George Cathcart Woolley, colonial administrator and ethnographer (internee)
- William Young, later a centenarian and last surviving veteran of the Royal Flying Corps (internee)

== See also ==
- List of Japanese-run internment camps during World War II
