= Michael P. O'Connor (writer) =

Irish doctor, writer, and broadcaster

Michael Patrick O'Connor (1896–1967) was an Irish doctor, writer and broadcaster.

O'Connor was born in Loughrea, County Galway, Ireland. He joined the British Army in 1914 and served in the Royal Irish Regiment in France and Belgium during World War I. A German gas attack in March 1918 ended his active career, and after the war he returned as part of an exhumation unit to re-inter battlefield dead in military cemeteries. In 1918 he enrolled at University College, Dublin, from where he gained a degree in medicine in 1925.

After a short period as a ship's surgeon, O’Connor decided to join the Colonial Medical Service in British Malaya. After completing a five-month course at the London School of Tropical Medicine, in February 1927 O’Connor travelled with his wife Kit and daughter to work in Malaya, where a second daughter was born in Batu Gajah. A third daughter was born in 1930. O'Connor served at Kuala Lipis for three years, and then in early 1935 transferred to Singapore to work in public health and preventative medicine; that same year his younger two daughters were sent to England to join their older sister at school in Dover. In early 1940 O'Connor and Kit moved to Sarawak, on the island of Borneo, where O’Connor had been appointed to the combined post of Principal Medical Officer and Chief Health Officer, based at Kuching General Hospital.

After the invasion of Sarawak in December 1941, O’Connor and his wife were interned by the Japanese for the duration of World War II, first in Kuching General Hospital in Sarawak from December 1941 until September 1943, and thereafter at the nearby Batu Lintang camp until its liberation on 11 September 1945. After their release the O’Connors returned to Ireland where Michael published novels and short stories and became well known through his regular broadcasts to children on Radio Éireann in the 1950s and early 1960s.

O'Connor published an autobiographical account of his time in Batu Lintang in The More Fool I. He went on to write two historical novels concerning the fall of Singapore and the war in the Far East in conjunction with Granville Pratt Willis, a fellow internee at Batu Lintang.

== Bibliography ==
- Dreamer Awake, Dublin: Talbot Press, 1946 (Novel)
- West and East, Dublin: Talbot Press, 1948 (Short stories)
- Vile Repose, London: Benn, 1950 (Novel)
- The More Fool I: A Piece of Autobiography, (Dublin: Michael F. Moynihan, 1954. Foreword by Agnes Newton Keith) (Autobiography)
- Seanchas na hÓige, Baile Átha Cliath: Oifig an tSoláthair, 1955 (Stories in Irish for children)
- Boyhood in Cathedral Town, date uncertain
- It Began in Singapore, (co-authored with Granville Pratt Willis) London: Robert Hale, 1958 (Novel)
- Escape at Dawn, (co-authored with Granville Pratt Willis) London: Robert Hale, 1961 (Novel)
