= William Young (veteran) =

One of the last surviving British veterans of World War I

- Born: 4 January 1900; Lanarkshire, Scotland
- Died: 24 July 2007 (aged 107); Perth, Australia
- Military career
- Allegiance: United Kingdom
- Branch: Royal Flying Corps
- Service years: 4 January 1918 – August 1919
- Rank: Corporal
- Nicknames: Will, Sandy
- Unit: Wireless Section
- Conflicts: World War I
- Awards: Legion of Honour – (1998)

William Alexander Smillie Young, also known as Sandy Young, (4 January 1900 – 24 July 2007) was, at age 107, one of the last surviving British veterans of the First World War. He later emigrated to Australia, and was the last known veteran of the Royal Flying Corps, in which he served as a radio operator.

== Early life ==
Young was born in Lanarkshire, Scotland, on 4 January 1900, the eldest of the six children of Robert Craig Young. His family moved to Hayes in Middlesex when he was 13, when his father became the manager of a Scots Jams factory, and he was educated at the county school in Southall.

== First World War ==
Young joined the Derby Scheme, under which young men under 18 could sign up to show their readiness to join the army or the air force when they turned 18 (later replaced by conscription under the Military Service Act 1916). He was not keen to join the infantry, as the casualty rate was so high; instead, on his 18th birthday in 1918, Young signed up for the RFC at its recruiting centre in Shepherd's Bush. He was assigned to the wireless section, and trained in Farnborough, Hampshire.

As a corporal radio operator, Young was assigned to the 14th Brigade Royal Horse Artillery, near Bapaume in France. His job was to take the messages sent via morse code from observation planes and pass the location of the target to a forward observation officer, who could then call down a bombardment from the brigade's 25-pounder field guns. He continued to serve in this role through the British offensive later that year, until the Armistice. Young caught the Spanish flu that winter. After he recovered, he was assigned to a unit of the Army of Occupation near Cologne.

Young was demobilised in August 1919.

== Later life ==
Young studied for a degree in chemistry at East London College (now Queen Mary, University of London in the University of London), later working in chemical factories in Argentina. In 1934 he married May Thompson, and they had one son.

During the Second World War he was working as the manager of a tannin extract company at Sandakan in North Borneo when the Japanese attacked Pearl Harbor in December 1941. His family escaped to Australia, but Young was captured after the Japanese took North Borneo in January 1942, and interned in a camp at Berhala Island near Sandakan. He was later moved to Batu Lintang camp near Kuching in Sarawak, where he was held as a civilian internee until the camp was liberated in 1945.

After the war, Young returned to Sandakan before emigrating to Australia. He became the manager of a tannin extract factory near Perth, Western Australia, and retired in 1970.

== Honours ==
Along with other survivors of the First World War, Young was awarded the Légion d'honneur by the French Government in 1998.

== Death ==
On the death of William Roberts on 30 April 2006, Young became the last surviving member of the Royal Flying Corps before it joined with the RNAS to become the RAF.

He died in his sleep in Perth, on 24 July 2007, at the age of 107, and was survived by his son, Alan, his wife May having predeceased him.
